= Causes of climate change =

Brown bars indicate drivers that increase global warming, and blue bars indicate those that decrease global warming. Future global warming potential for long lived drivers like carbon dioxide emissions is not represented.

The scientific community has been investigating the causes of current climate change for decades. After thousands of studies, the scientific consensus is that it is "unequivocal that human influence has warmed the atmosphere, ocean and land since pre-industrial times." This consensus is supported by around 200 scientific organizations worldwide. The scientific principle underlying current climate change is the greenhouse effect, which provides that greenhouse gases pass sunlight that heats the earth, but trap some of the resulting heat that radiates from the planet's surface. Large amounts of greenhouse gases such as carbon dioxide and methane have been released into the atmosphere through burning of fossil fuels since the industrial revolution. Indirect emissions from land use change, emissions of other greenhouse gases such as nitrous oxide, and increased concentrations of water vapor in the atmosphere, also contribute to climate change.

Observed temperature vs the 1850–1900 average used by the IPCC as a pre-industrial baseline. The primary driver for increased global temperatures in the industrial era is human activity, with natural forces adding variability.

The warming from the greenhouse effect has a logarithmic relationship with the concentration of greenhouse gases. This means that every additional fraction of CO_{2} and the other greenhouse gases in the atmosphere has a slightly smaller warming effect than the fractions before it as the total concentration increases. However, only around half of CO_{2} emissions continually reside in the atmosphere in the first place, as the other half is quickly absorbed by carbon sinks in the land and oceans. Further, the warming per unit of greenhouse gases is also affected by feedbacks, such as the changes in water vapor concentrations or Earth's albedo (reflectivity).

As the warming from CO_{2} increases, carbon sinks absorb a smaller fraction of total emissions, while the "fast" climate change feedbacks amplify greenhouse gas warming. Thus, the effects counteract one another, and the warming from each unit of CO_{2} emitted by humans increases temperature in linear proportion to the total amount of emissions. Further, some fraction of the greenhouse warming has been "masked" by the human-caused emissions of sulfur dioxide, which forms aerosols that have a cooling effect. However, this masking has been receding in the recent years, due to measures to combat acid rain and air pollution caused by sulfates.

== Factors affecting Earth's climate ==
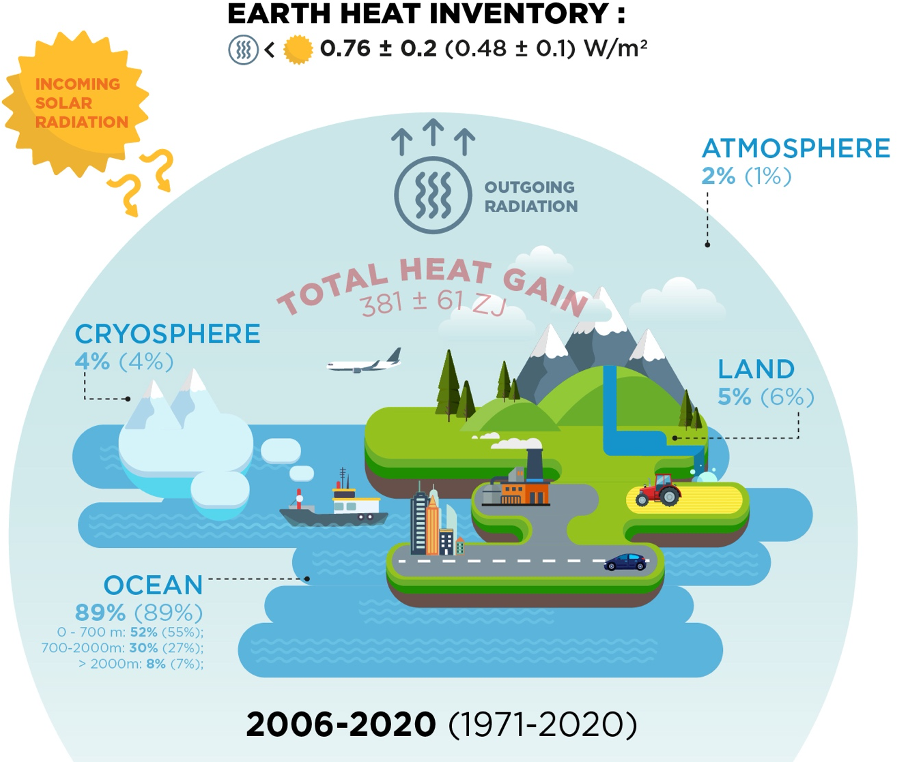
A diagram which shows where the extra heat retained on Earth due to the energy imbalance is going.

A forcing is something that is imposed externally on the climate system. External forcings include natural phenomena such as volcanic eruptions and variations in the sun's output. Human activities can also impose forcings, for example, through changing the composition of Earth's atmosphere. Radiative forcing is a measure of how various factors alter the energy balance of planet Earth. A positive radiative forcing will lead towards a warming of the surface and, over time, the climate system. Between the start of the Industrial Revolution in 1750, and the year 2005, the increase in the atmospheric concentration of carbon dioxide (chemical formula: CO_{2}) led to a positive radiative forcing, averaged over the Earth's surface area, of about 1.66 watts per square metre (abbreviated W m^{−2}).

Climate feedbacks can either amplify or dampen the response of the climate to a given forcing. There are many feedback mechanisms in the climate system that can either amplify (a positive feedback) or diminish (a negative feedback) the effects of a change in climate forcing.

The climate system varies in response to changes in external forcings. The climate system also has internal variability both in the presence and absence of external forcings. This internal variability is a result of complex interactions between components within the climate system, such as the coupling between the atmosphere and ocean. An example of internal variability is the El Niño–Southern Oscillation.

== Human-caused influences ==
Energy flows between space, the atmosphere, and Earth's surface. Rising greenhouse gas levels are contributing to an energy imbalance.

Factors affecting Earth's climate can be broken down into forcings, feedbacks and internal variations. Four main lines of evidence support the dominant role of human activities in recent climate change:

1. A physical understanding of the climate system: greenhouse gas concentrations have increased and their warming properties are well-established.
2. There are historical estimates of past climate changes suggest that the recent changes in global surface temperature are unusual.
3. Advanced climate models are unable to replicate the observed warming unless human greenhouse gas emissions are included.
4. Observations of natural forces, such as solar and volcanic activity, show that solar activity cannot explain the observed warming. For example, an increase in solar activity would have warmed the entire atmosphere, yet only the lower atmosphere has warmed.

Observations from space show that Earth's energy imbalance—a measure of how much more energy Earth absorbs than it radiates into space—reached values in 2023 that were twice that of the best estimate from the IPCC.

=== Greenhouse gases ===
Warming influence of atmospheric greenhouse gases has nearly doubled since 1979, with carbon dioxide and methane being the dominant drivers.

Greenhouse gases are transparent to sunlight, and thus allow it to pass through the atmosphere to heat the Earth's surface. The Earth radiates it as heat, and greenhouse gases absorb a portion of it. This absorption slows the rate at which heat escapes into space, trapping heat near the Earth's surface and warming it over time. While water vapour and clouds are the biggest contributors to the greenhouse effect, they primarily change as a function of temperature. Therefore, they are considered to be feedbacks that change climate sensitivity. On the other hand, gases such as CO_{2}, tropospheric ozone, CFCs and nitrous oxide are added or removed independently from temperature. Hence, they are considered to be external forcings that change global temperatures.

CO_{2} concentrations over the last 800,000 years as measured from ice cores (blue/green) and directly (black)

Human activity since the Industrial Revolution (about 1750), mainly extracting and burning fossil fuels (coal, oil, and natural gas), has increased the amount of greenhouse gases in the atmosphere, resulting in a radiative imbalance. Over the past 150 years human activities have released increasing quantities of greenhouse gases into the atmosphere. By 2019, the concentrations of CO_{2} and methane had increased by about 48% and 160%, respectively, since 1750. These CO_{2} levels are higher than they have been at any time during the last 2 million years. Concentrations of methane are far higher than they were over the last 800,000 years.

This has led to increases in mean global temperature, or global warming. The likely range of human-induced surface-level air warming by 2010–2019 compared to levels in 1850–1900 is 0.8 °C to 1.3 °C, with a best estimate of 1.07 °C. This is close to the observed overall warming during that time of 0.9 °C to 1.2 °C. Temperature changes during that time were likely only ±0.1 °C due to natural forcings and ±0.2 °C due to variability in the climate.

Global anthropogenic greenhouse gas emissions in 2019 were equivalent to 59 billion tonnes of CO_{2}. Of these emissions, 75% was CO_{2}, 18% was methane, 4% was nitrous oxide, and 2% was fluorinated gases.

==== Carbon dioxide ====
The Global Carbon Project shows how additions to CO_{2} have been caused by different sources ramping up one after another.

The Keeling Curve shows the long-term increase of atmospheric carbon dioxide (CO_{2}) concentrations since 1958.

CO_{2} emissions primarily come from burning fossil fuels to provide energy for transport, manufacturing, heating, and electricity. Additional CO_{2} emissions come from deforestation and industrial processes, which include the CO_{2} released by the chemical reactions for making cement, steel, aluminum, and fertiliser.

CO_{2} is absorbed and emitted naturally as part of the carbon cycle, through animal and plant respiration, volcanic eruptions, and ocean-atmosphere exchange. Human activities, such as the burning of fossil fuels and changes in land use (see below), release large amounts of carbon to the atmosphere, causing CO_{2} concentrations in the atmosphere to rise.

The high-accuracy measurements of atmospheric CO_{2} concentration, initiated by Charles David Keeling in 1958, constitute the master time series documenting the changing composition of the atmosphere. These data, known as the Keeling Curve, have iconic status in climate change science as evidence of the effect of human activities on the chemical composition of the global atmosphere.

Keeling's initial 1958 measurements showed 313 parts per million by volume (ppm). Atmospheric CO_{2} concentrations, commonly written "ppm", are measured in parts-per-million by volume (ppmv). In May 2019, the concentration of CO_{2} in the atmosphere reached 415 ppm. The last time when it reached this level was 2.6–5.3 million years ago. Without human intervention, it would be 280 ppm.

In 2022–2024, the concentration of CO_{2} in the atmosphere increased faster than ever before according to National Oceanic and Atmospheric Administration, as a result of sustained emissions and El Niño conditions.

In November, 2025 Global Carbon Budget predicted CO_{2} emissions from burning coal, oil and gas would be a record 38.1 billion tonnes in 2025, up 1.1 percent from the prior year.

==== Methane and nitrous oxide ====
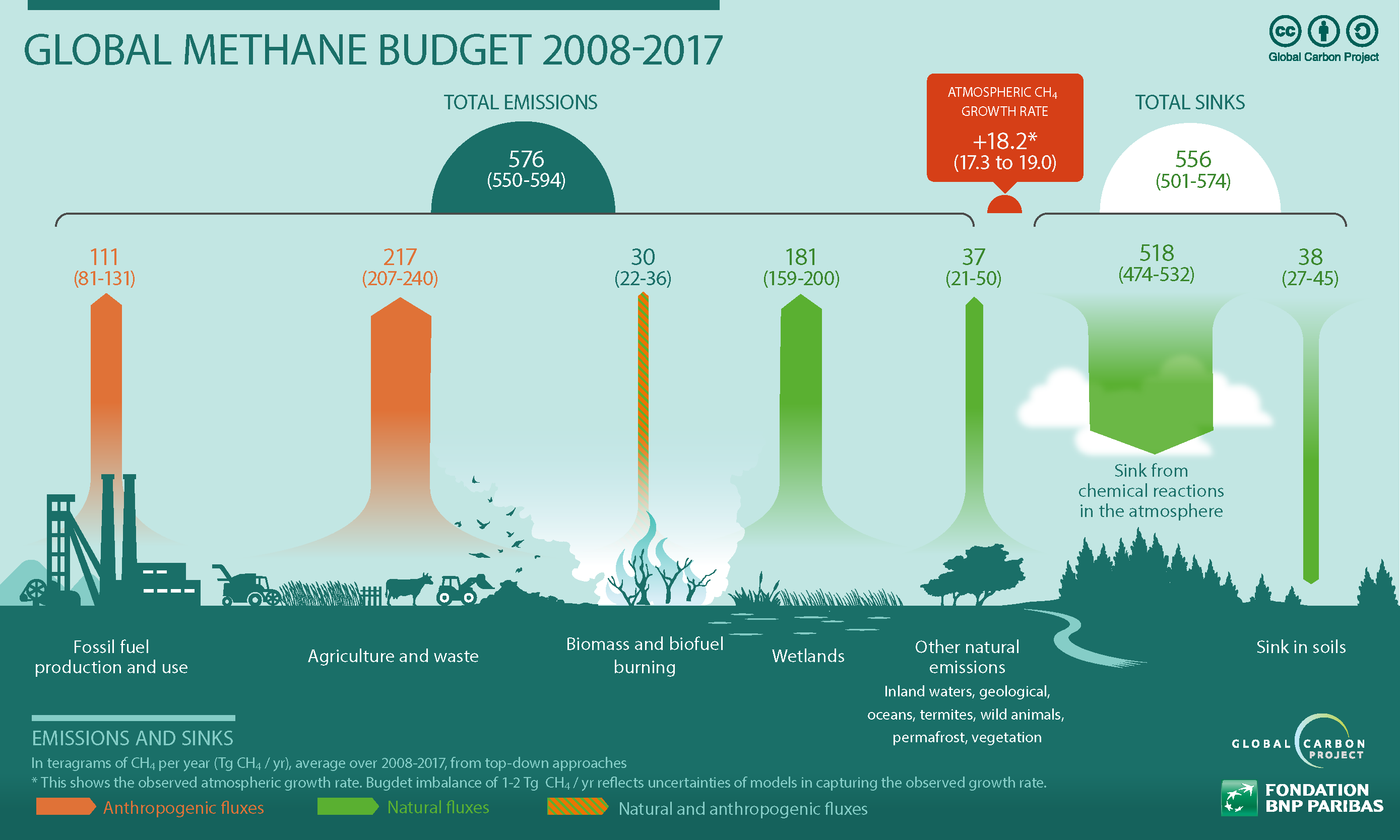
Main sources of global methane emissions (2008–2017) according to the Global Carbon Project

Methane emissions come from livestock, manure, rice cultivation, landfills, wastewater, and coal mining, as well as oil and gas extraction. Nitrous oxide emissions largely come from the microbial decomposition of fertiliser.

Methane and to a lesser extent nitrous oxide are also major forcing contributors to the greenhouse effect. The Kyoto Protocol lists these together with hydrofluorocarbon (HFCs), perfluorocarbons (PFCs), and sulfur hexafluoride (SF_{6}), which are entirely artificial gases, as contributors to radiative forcing. The chart at right attributes anthropogenic greenhouse gas emissions to eight main economic sectors, of which the largest contributors are power stations (many of which burn coal or other fossil fuels), industrial processes, transportation fuels (generally fossil fuels), and agricultural by-products (mainly methane from enteric fermentation and nitrous oxide from fertilizer use).

=== Aerosols ===
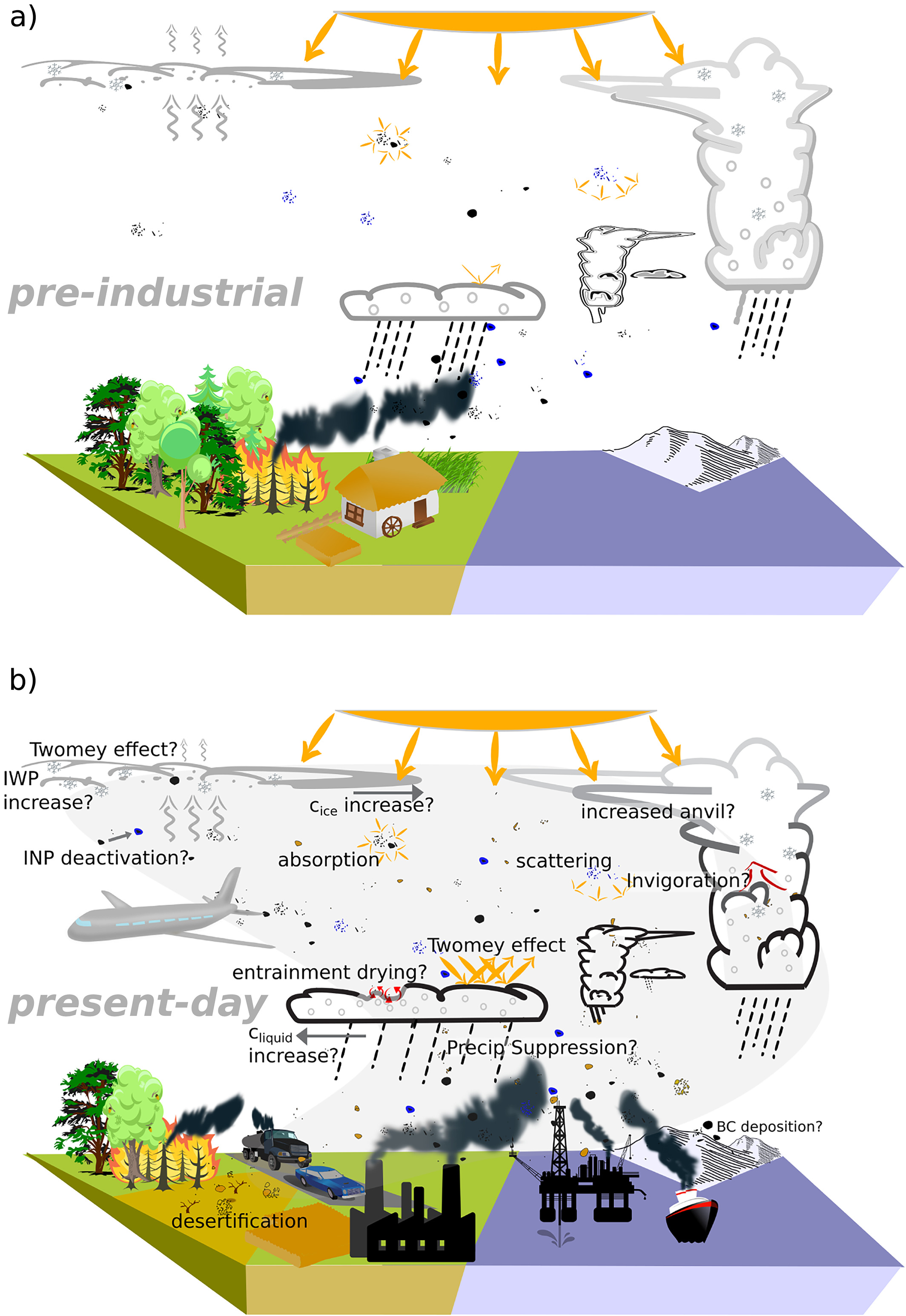
Air pollution has substantially increased the presence of aerosols in the atmosphere when compared to the preindustrial background levels. Different types of particles have different effects, but overall, cooling from aerosols formed by sulfur dioxide emissions has the overwhelming impact. However, the complexity of aerosol interactions in atmospheric layers makes the exact strength of cooling very difficult to estimate.

Air pollution, in the form of aerosols, affects the climate on a large scale. Aerosols scatter and absorb solar radiation. From 1961 to 1990, a gradual reduction in the amount of sunlight reaching the Earth's surface was observed. This phenomenon is popularly known as global dimming, and is primarily attributed to sulfate aerosols produced by the combustion of fossil fuels with heavy sulfur concentrations like coal and bunker fuel. Smaller contributions come from black carbon, organic carbon from combustion of fossil fuels and biofuels, and from anthropogenic dust. Globally, aerosols have been declining since 1990 due to pollution controls, meaning that they no longer mask greenhouse gas warming as much.

Aerosols also have indirect effects on the Earth's energy budget. Sulfate aerosols act as cloud condensation nuclei and lead to clouds that have more and smaller cloud droplets. These clouds reflect solar radiation more efficiently than clouds with fewer and larger droplets. They also reduce the growth of raindrops, which makes clouds more reflective to incoming sunlight. Indirect effects of aerosols are the largest uncertainty in radiative forcing.

While aerosols typically limit global warming by reflecting sunlight, black carbon in soot that falls on snow or ice can contribute to global warming. Not only does this increase the absorption of sunlight, it also increases melting and sea-level rise. Limiting new black carbon deposits in the Arctic could reduce global warming by 0.2 °C by 2050.

=== Land surface changes ===
The rate of global tree cover loss has approximately doubled since 2001, to an annual loss approaching an area the size of Italy.

According to Food and Agriculture Organization, around 30% of Earth's land area is largely unusable for humans (glaciers, deserts, etc.), 26% is forests, 10% is shrubland and 34% is agricultural land. Deforestation is the main land use change contributor to global warming, Between 1750 and 2007, about one-third of anthropogenic CO_{2} emissions were from changes in land use - primarily from the decline in forest area and the growth in agricultural land. primarily deforestation. as the destroyed trees release CO_{2}, and are not replaced by new trees, removing that carbon sink. Between 2001 and 2018, 27% of deforestation was from permanent clearing to enable agricultural expansion for crops and livestock. Another 24% has been lost to temporary clearing under the shifting cultivation agricultural systems. 26% was due to logging for wood and derived products, and wildfires have accounted for the remaining 23%. Some forests have not been fully cleared, but were already degraded by these impacts. Restoring these forests also recovers their potential as a carbon sink.

Cumulative land-use change contributions to CO_{2} emissions, by region.

Local vegetation cover impacts how much of the sunlight gets reflected back into space (albedo), and how much heat is lost by evaporation. For instance, the change from a dark forest to grassland makes the surface lighter, causing it to reflect more sunlight. Deforestation can also modify the release of chemical compounds that influence clouds, and by changing wind patterns. In tropic and temperate areas the net effect is to produce significant warming, and forest restoration can make local temperatures cooler. At latitudes closer to the poles, there is a cooling effect as forest is replaced by snow-covered (and more reflective) plains. Globally, these increases in surface albedo have been the dominant direct influence on temperature from land use change. Thus, land use change to date is estimated to have a slight cooling effect.

==== Livestock-associated emissions ====
Meat from cattle and sheep have the highest emissions intensity of any agricultural commodity.

More than 18% of anthropogenic greenhouse gas emissions are attributed to livestock and livestock-related activities such as deforestation and increasingly fuel-intensive farming practices. Specific attributions to the livestock sector include:

- 9% of global anthropogenic carbon dioxide emissions
- 35–40% of global anthropogenic methane emissions (chiefly due to enteric fermentation and manure)
- 64% of global anthropogenic nitrous oxide emissions, chiefly due to fertilizer use.

=== Others ===
Marine plastic pollution reduces the ability of the oceans to absorb CO_{2} by reducing the photosynthesis of phytoplankton and altering the metabolism in zooplankton. It also creates GHG emissions by creating GHG emitting microbial communities from the decomposition of plastic. This can even change the oceans from a carbon sink to a carbon source.

== Methods for attribution ==
=== "Fingerprint" studies ===
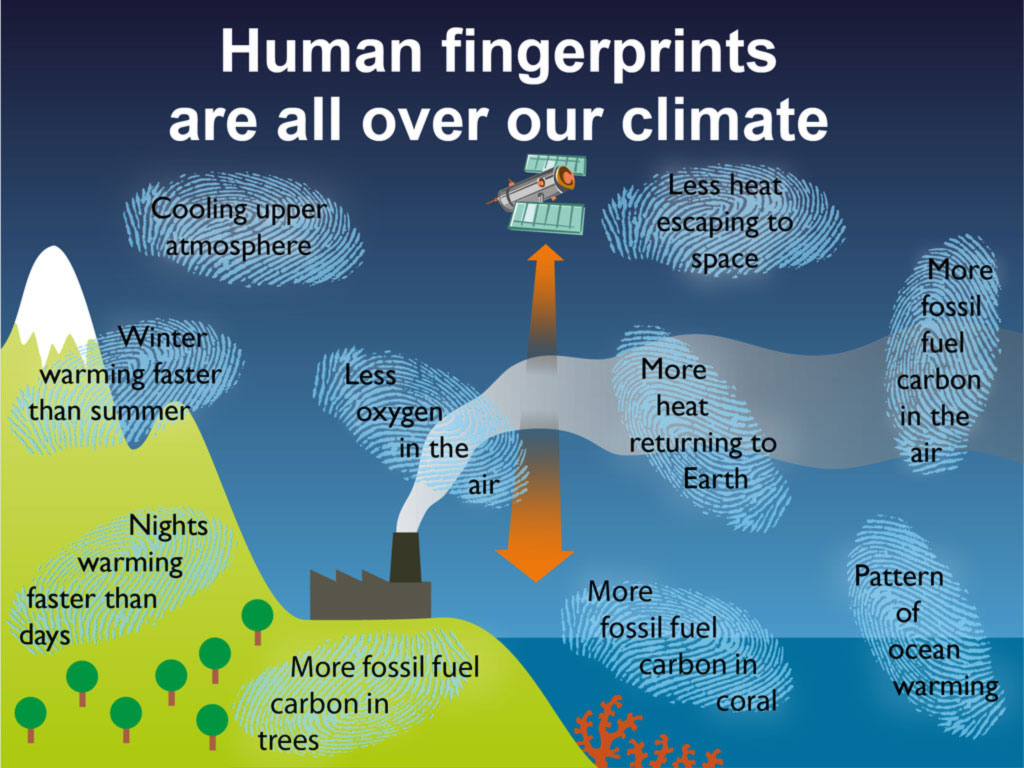
Human fingerprints for global warming (summary of observational evidence that human carbon dioxide emissions are causing the climate to warm).

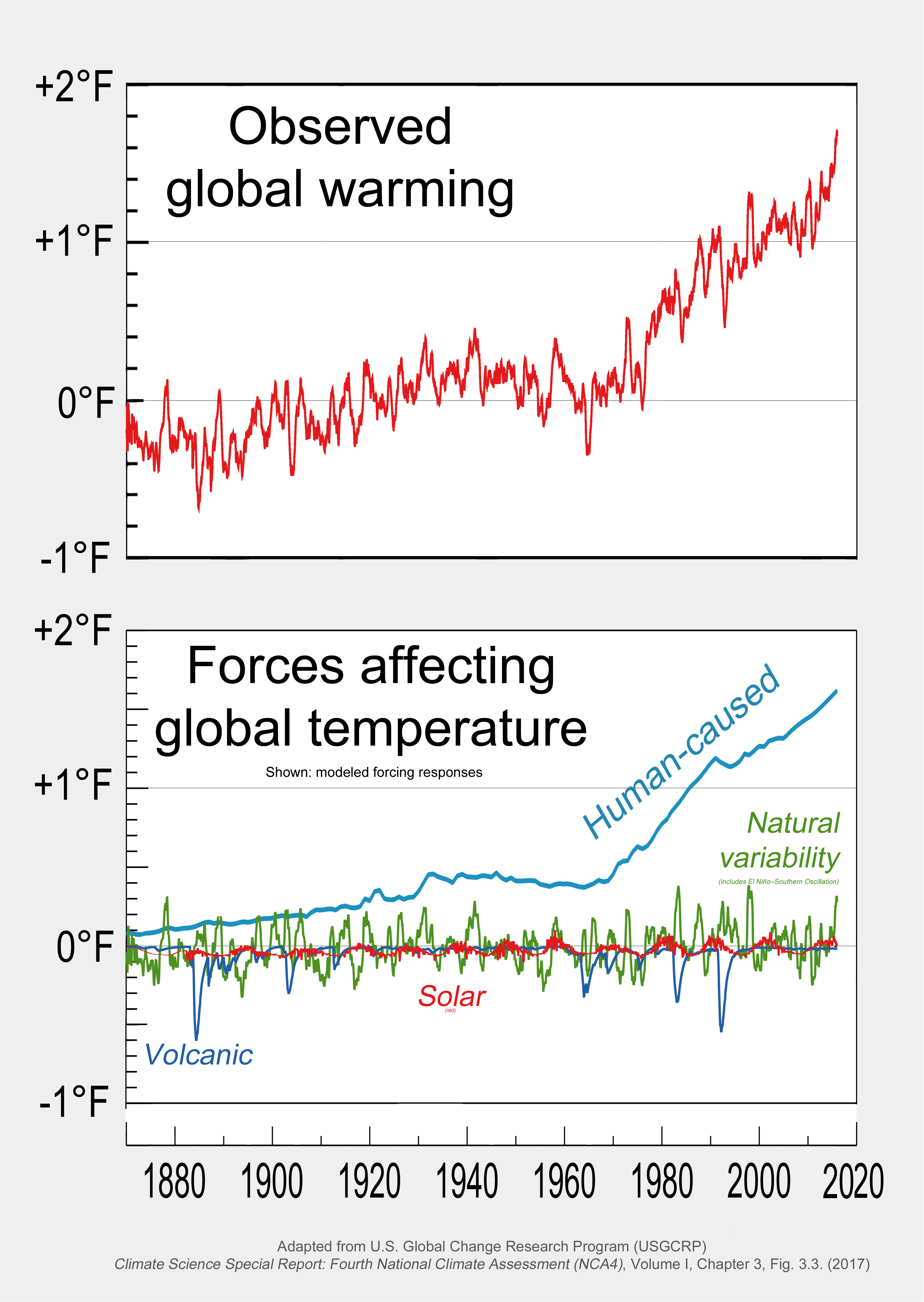
Top panel: Observed global average temperature change (1870— ).Bottom panel: Data from the Fourth National Climate Assessment is merged for display on the same scale to emphasize relative strengths of forces affecting temperature change. Human-caused forces have increasingly dominated.

To determine the human contribution to climate change, unique "fingerprints" for all potential causes are developed and compared with both observed patterns and known internal climate variability. For example, solar forcing—whose fingerprint involves warming the entire atmosphere—is ruled out because only the lower atmosphere has warmed. Atmospheric aerosols produce a smaller, cooling effect. Other drivers, such as changes in albedo, are less impactful.

Fingerprint studies exploit these unique signatures, and allow detailed comparisons of modelled and observed climate change patterns. Scientists rely on such studies to attribute observed changes in climate to a particular cause or set of causes. In the real world, the climate changes that have occurred since the start of the Industrial Revolution are due to a complex mixture of human and natural causes. The importance of each individual influence in this mixture changes over time. Therefore, climate models are used to study how individual factors affect climate. For example, a single factor (like greenhouse gases) or a set of factors can be varied, and the response of the modelled climate system to these individual or combined changes can thus be studied.

These projections have been confirmed by observations (shown above). For example, when climate model simulations of the last century include all of the major influences on climate, both human-induced and natural, they can reproduce many important features of observed climate change patterns. When human influences are removed from the model experiments, results suggest that the surface of the Earth would actually have cooled slightly over the last 50 years. The clear message from fingerprint studies is that the observed warming over the last half-century cannot be explained by natural factors, and is instead caused primarily by human factors.

==== Atmospheric fingerprints ====
Another fingerprint of human effects on climate has been identified by looking at a slice through the layers of the atmosphere, and studying the pattern of temperature changes from the surface up through the stratosphere (see the section on solar activity). The earliest fingerprint work focused on changes in surface and atmospheric temperature. Scientists then applied fingerprint methods to a whole range of climate variables, identifying human-caused climate signals in the heat content of the oceans, the height of the tropopause (the boundary between the troposphere and stratosphere, which has shifted upward by hundreds of feet in recent decades), the geographical patterns of precipitation, drought, surface pressure, and the runoff from major river basins.

Studies published after the appearance of the IPCC Fourth Assessment Report in 2007 have also found human fingerprints in the increased levels of atmospheric moisture (both close to the surface and over the full extent of the atmosphere), in the decline of Arctic sea ice extent, and in the patterns of changes in Arctic and Antarctic surface temperatures.

== Ripple effects ==
=== Carbon sinks ===
CO_{2} sources and sinks since 1880. While there is little debate that excess carbon dioxide in the industrial era has mostly come from burning fossil fuels, the future strength of land and ocean carbon sinks is an area of study.

The Earth's surface absorbs CO_{2} as part of the carbon cycle. Despite the contribution of deforestation to greenhouse gas emissions, the Earth's land surface, particularly its forests, remain a significant carbon sink for CO_{2}. Land-surface sink processes, such as carbon fixation in the soil and photosynthesis, remove about 29% of annual global CO_{2} emissions. The ocean also serves as a significant carbon sink via a two-step process. First, CO_{2} dissolves in the surface water. Afterwards, the ocean's overturning circulation distributes it deep into the ocean's interior, where it accumulates over time as part of the carbon cycle. Over the last two decades, the world's oceans have absorbed 20 to 30% of emitted CO_{2}. Thus, around half of human-caused CO_{2} emissions have been absorbed by land plants and by the oceans.

This fraction of absorbed emissions is not static. If future CO_{2} emissions decrease, the Earth will be able to absorb up to around 70%. If they increase substantially, it'll still absorb more carbon than now, but the overall fraction will decrease to below 40%. This is because climate change increases droughts and heat waves that eventually inhibit plant growth on land, and soils will release more carbon from dead plants when they are warmer. The rate at which oceans absorb atmospheric carbon will be lowered as they become more acidic and experience changes in thermohaline circulation and phytoplankton distribution.

=== Climate change feedbacks ===
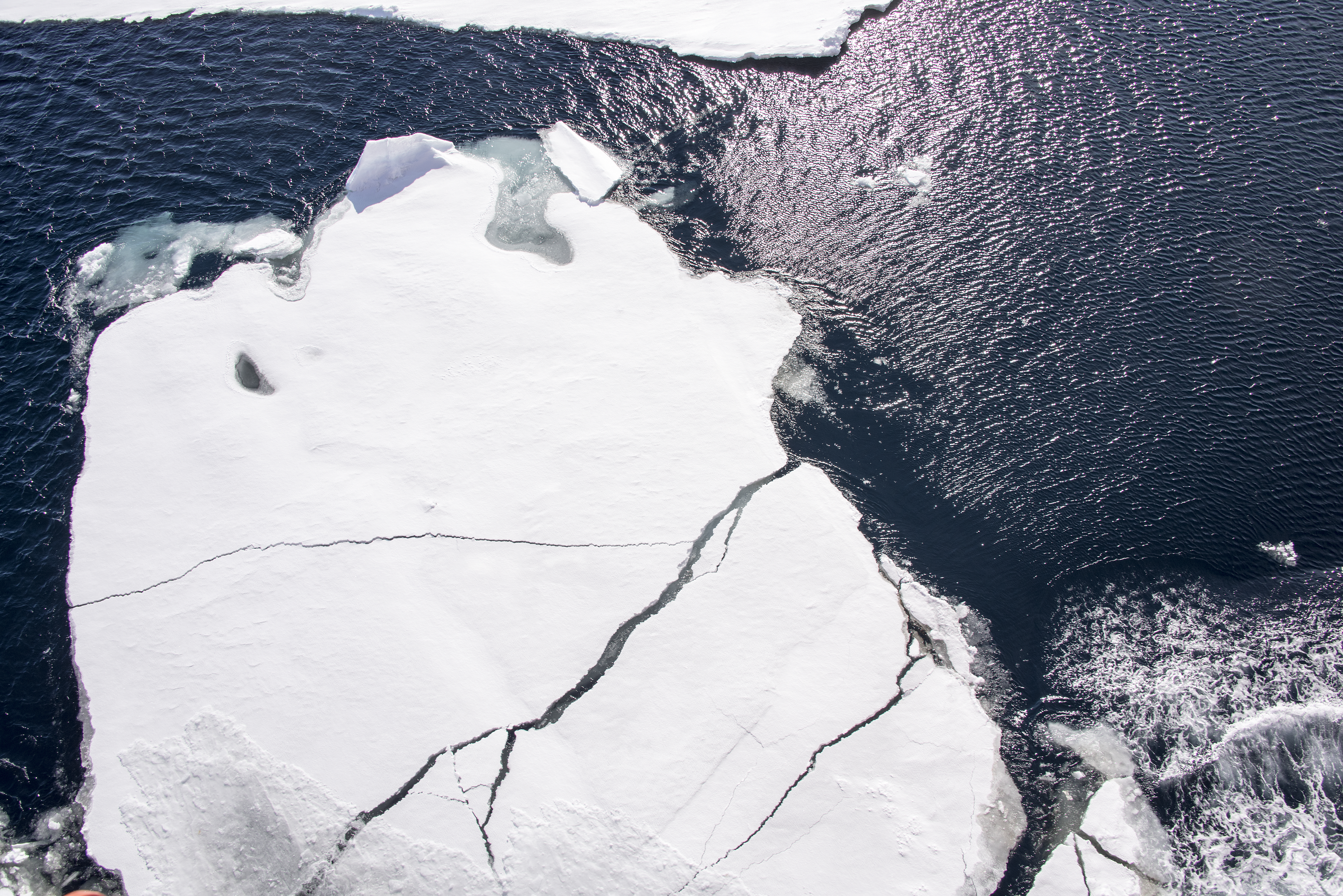
Sea ice reflects 50% to 70% of incoming sunlight, while the ocean, being darker, reflects only 6%. As an area of sea ice melts and exposes more ocean, more heat is absorbed by the ocean, raising temperatures that melt still more ice. This is a positive feedback process.

The response of the climate system to an initial forcing is modified by feedbacks: increased by "self-reinforcing" or "positive" feedbacks and reduced by "balancing" or "negative" feedbacks. The main reinforcing feedbacks are the water-vapour feedback, the ice–albedo feedback, and the net effect of clouds. The primary balancing mechanism is radiative cooling, as Earth's surface gives off more heat to space in response to rising temperature. In addition to temperature feedbacks, there are feedbacks in the carbon cycle, such as the fertilizing effect of CO_{2} on plant growth.

Uncertainty over feedbacks, particularly cloud cover, is the major reason why different climate models project different magnitudes of warming for a given amount of emissions. As air warms, it can hold more moisture. Water vapour, as a potent greenhouse gas, holds heat in the atmosphere. If cloud cover increases, more sunlight will be reflected back into space, cooling the planet. If clouds become higher and thinner, they act as an insulator, reflecting heat from below back downwards and warming the planet.

Another major feedback is the reduction of snow cover and sea ice in the Arctic, which reduces the reflectivity of the Earth's surface. More of the Sun's energy is now absorbed in these regions, contributing to amplification of Arctic temperature changes. Arctic amplification is also thawing permafrost, which releases methane and CO_{2} into the atmosphere. Climate change can also cause methane releases from wetlands, marine systems, and freshwater systems. Overall, climate feedbacks are expected to become increasingly positive.

== Natural variability ==
The Fourth National Climate Assessment ("NCA4", USGCRP, 2017) includes charts illustrating that neither solar nor volcanic activity can explain the observed warming.

Already in 2001, the IPCC Third Assessment Report had found that, "The combined change in radiative forcing of the two major natural factors (solar variation and volcanic aerosols) is estimated to be negative for the past two, and possibly the past four, decades." Solar irradiance has been measured directly by satellites, and indirect measurements are available from the early 1600s onwards. Yet, since 1880, there has been no upward trend in the amount of the Sun's energy reaching the Earth, in contrast to the warming of the lower atmosphere (the troposphere). Similarly, volcanic activity has the single largest natural impact (forcing) on temperature, yet it is equivalent to less than 1% of current human-caused CO_{2} emissions. Volcanic activity as a whole has had negligible impacts on global temperature trends since the Industrial Revolution.

Between 1750 and 2007, solar radiation may have at most increased by 0.12 W/m^{2}, compared to 1.6 W/m^{2} for the net anthropogenic forcing. Consequently, the observed rapid rise in global mean temperatures seen after 1985 cannot be ascribed to solar variability." Further, the upper atmosphere (the stratosphere) would also be warming if the Sun was sending more energy to Earth, but instead, it has been cooling. This is consistent with greenhouse gases preventing heat from leaving the Earth's atmosphere.

Explosive volcanic eruptions can release gases, dust and ash that partially block sunlight and reduce temperatures, or they can send water vapor into the atmosphere, which adds to greenhouse gases and increases temperatures. Because both water vapor and volcanic material have low persistence in the atmosphere, even the largest eruptions only have an effect for several years.

== See also ==
- Climate change adaptation
- Climate change denial
- Climate change mitigation
- Climate resilience
