= Ice–albedo feedback =

Positive feedback climate process

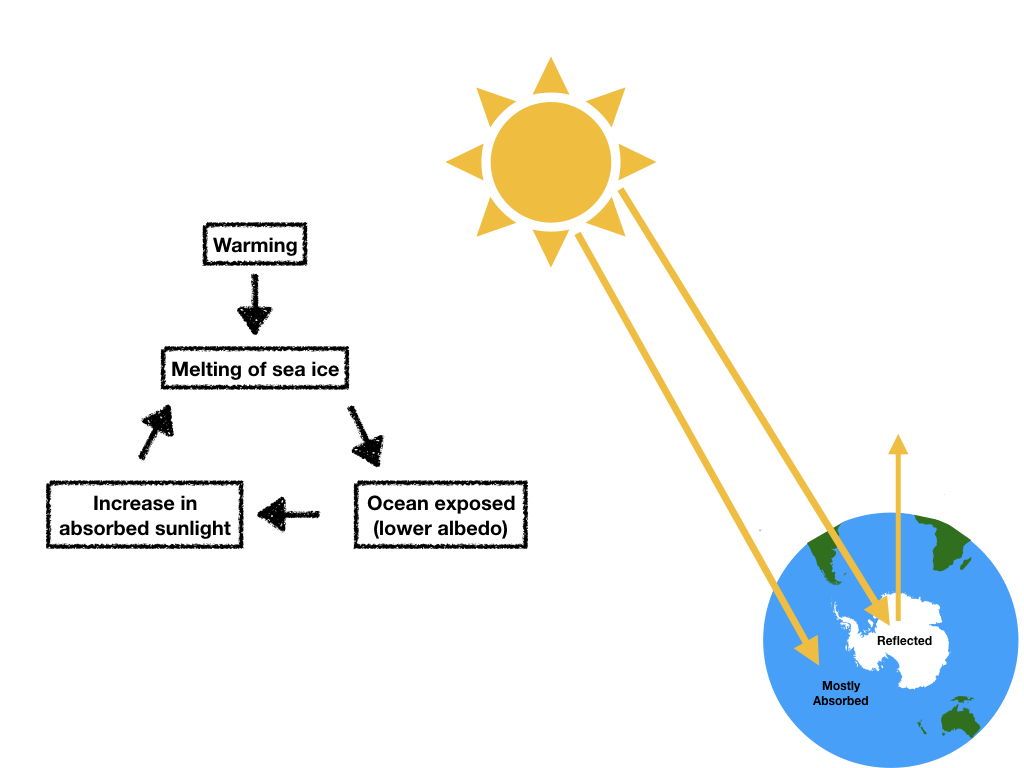
Diagram of ice–albedo feedback. Ice reflects more light back into space, whereas land and water absorb more of the sunlight.

Ice–albedo feedback is a climate change feedback, in which a change in the area of ice caps, glaciers, and sea ice alters the albedo and surface temperature of a planet. Because ice is very reflective, it reflects far more solar energy back to space than open water or any other land cover. It occurs on Earth, and can also occur on exoplanets.

Since higher latitudes have the coolest temperatures, they are the most likely to have perennial snow cover, widespread glaciers and ice caps - up to and including the potential to form ice sheets. However, if warming occurs, then higher temperatures would decrease ice-covered area, and expose more open water or land. The albedo decreases, and so more solar energy is absorbed, leading to more warming and greater loss of the reflective parts of the cryosphere. Inversely, cooler temperatures increase ice cover, which increases albedo and results in greater cooling, which makes further ice formation more likely.

Thus, ice–albedo feedback plays a powerful role in global climate change. It was important both for the beginning of Snowball Earth conditions nearly 720 million years ago and for their end about 630 mya: the deglaciation had likely involved gradual darkening of albedo due to build-up of dust. In the more recent geologically past, this feedback was a core factor in ice sheet advances and retreats during the Pleistocene period (~2.6 Ma to ~10 ka ago). More recently, human-caused increases in greenhouse gas emissions have had many impacts across the globe, and Arctic sea ice decline has been one of the most visible. As the sea ice cover shrinks and reflects less sunlight, the Arctic warms up to four times faster than the global average. Globally, the decades-long ice loss in the Arctic and the more recent decline of sea ice in Antarctica have had the same warming impact between 1992 and 2018 as 10% of all the greenhouse gases emitted over the same period.

Ice–albedo feedback has been present in some of the earliest climate models, so they have been simulating these observed impacts for decades. Consequently, their projections of future warming also include future losses of sea ice alongside the other drivers of climate change. It is estimated that persistent loss during the Arctic summer, when the Sun shines most intensely and lack of reflective surface has the greatest impacts, would produce global warming of around 0.19 °C (0.34 °F). There are also model estimates of warming impact from the loss of both mountain glaciers and the ice sheets in Greenland and Antarctica. However, warming from their loss is generally smaller than from the declining sea ice, and it would also take a very long time to be seen in full.

== Early research ==
In the 1950s, early climatologists such as Syukuro Manabe were already attempting to describe the role of ice cover in Earth's energy budget. In 1969, both USSR's Mikhail Ivanovich Budyko and the United States' William D. Sellers published papers presenting some of the first energy-balance climate models to demonstrate that the reflectivity of ice had a substantial impact on the Earth's climate, and that changes to snow-ice cover in either direction could act as a powerful feedback.

This process was soon recognized as a crucial part of climate modelling in a 1974 review, and in 1975, the general circulation model used by Manabe and Richard T. Wetherald to describe the effects of doubling CO_{2} concentration in the atmosphere - a key measurement of climate sensitivity - has also already incorporated what it described as "snow cover feedback". Ice-albedo feedback continues to be included in the subsequent models. Calculations of the feedback are also applied to paleoclimate studies, such as those of the Pleistocene period (~2.6 Ma to ~10 ka ago).

== Current role ==
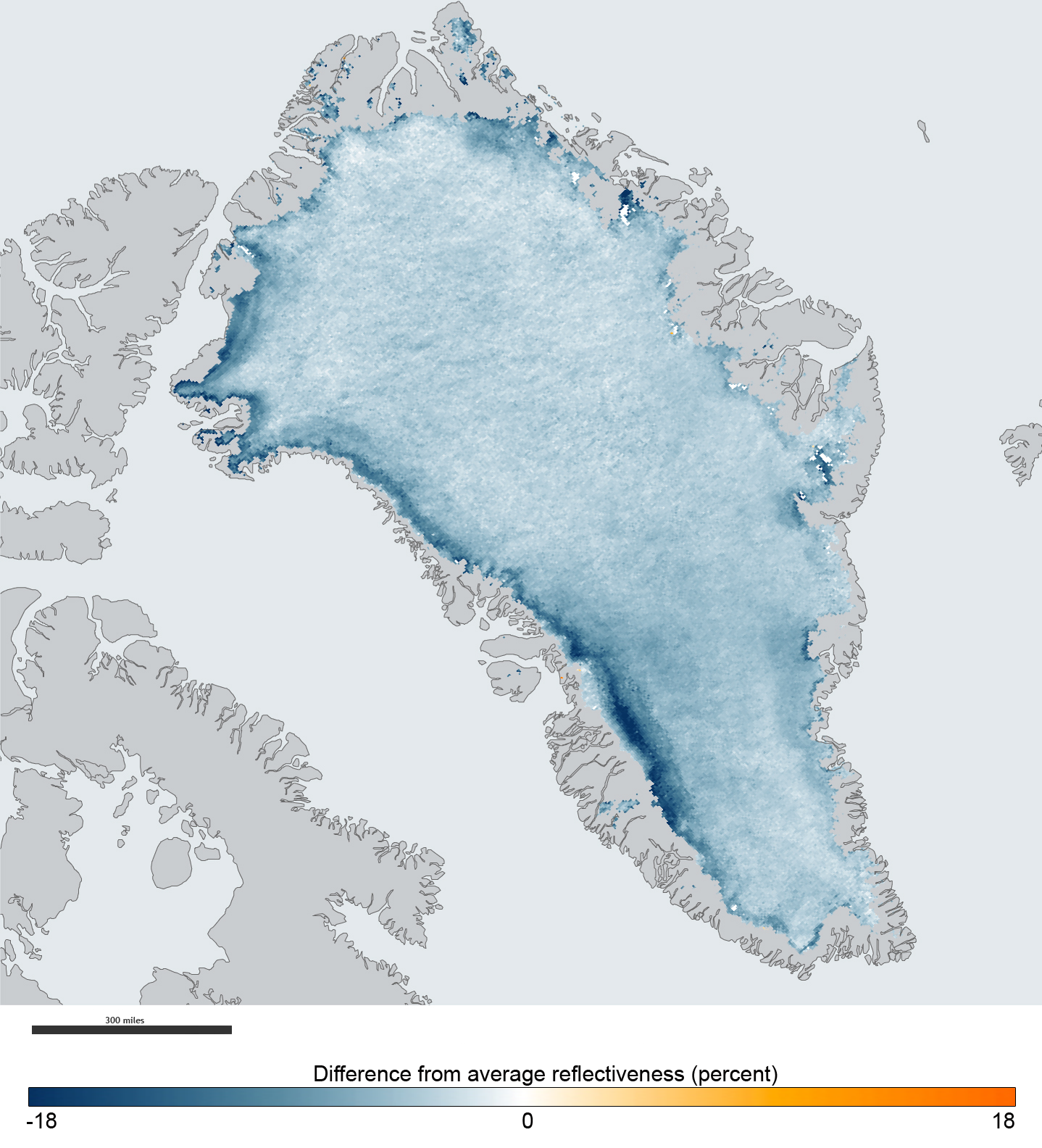
Albedo change in Greenland from 2000-2006 to 2011. Practically the entire ice sheet became less reflective

Snow– and ice–albedo feedback have a substantial effect on regional temperatures. In particular, the presence of ice cover and sea ice makes the North Pole and the South Pole colder than they would have been without it. Consequently, recent Arctic sea ice decline is one of the primary factors behind the Arctic warming nearly four times faster than the global average since 1979 (the year when continuous satellite readings of the Arctic sea ice began), in a phenomenon known as Arctic amplification.

Modelling studies show that strong Arctic amplification only occurs during the months when significant sea ice loss occurs, and that it largely disappears when the simulated ice cover is held fixed. Conversely, the high stability of ice cover in Antarctica, where the thickness of the East Antarctic ice sheet allows it to rise nearly 4 km above the sea level, means that this continent has experienced very little net warming over the past seven decades, most of which was concentrated in West Antarctica. Ice loss in the Antarctic and its contribution to sea level rise is instead driven overwhelmingly by the warming of the Southern Ocean, which absorbed 35–43% of the total heat taken up by all oceans between 1970 and 2017.

Ice–albedo feedback also has a smaller, but still notable effect on the global temperatures. Arctic sea ice decline between 1979 and 2011 is estimated to have been responsible for 0.21 watts per square meter (W/m^{2}) of radiative forcing, which is equivalent to a quarter of radiative forcing from CO_{2} increases over the same period. When compared to cumulative increases in greenhouse gas radiative forcing since the start of the Industrial Revolution, it is equivalent to the estimated 2019 radiative forcing from nitrous oxide (0.21 W/m^{2}), nearly half of 2019 radiative forcing from methane (0.54 W/m^{2}) and 10% of the cumulative CO_{2} increase (2.16 W/m^{2}). Between 1992 and 2015, this effect was partly offset by the growth in sea ice cover around Antarctica, which produced cooling of about 0.06 W/m^{2} per decade. However, Antarctic sea ice had also begun to decline afterwards, and the combined role of changes in ice cover between 1992 and 2018 is equivalent to 10% of all the anthropogenic greenhouse gas emissions.

=== 2023 albedo record lows ===
In 2023, Antarctica reached its lowest extent in the 45 year satellite record. February's summer minimum was recorded to fall by 1.79 million km^{2}, which is 38% lower than the 1981-2000 climatological mean. September's winter maximum of 16.96 million km^{2} broke the previous record by over one million km^{2}, which is around the area the size of Texas and California.

Researchers found that a deepened Amundsen Sea low in the previous spring acted as a key trigger to mass melting. Anomalous northward sea ice transport created large expanses of open water, which lowered the surface albedo and created a positive ice-albedo feedback loop accelerating melting through increased solar absorption. In 2023, global mean temperatures also reached 1.5 K above pre-industrial levels. Even after accounting for anthropogenic warming and El Niño events, there was an unexpected gap of around 0.2 K. This gap was attributed to the record planetary lows in albedo, with around 0.22 ± 0.04 K in contribution.

== Future impact ==
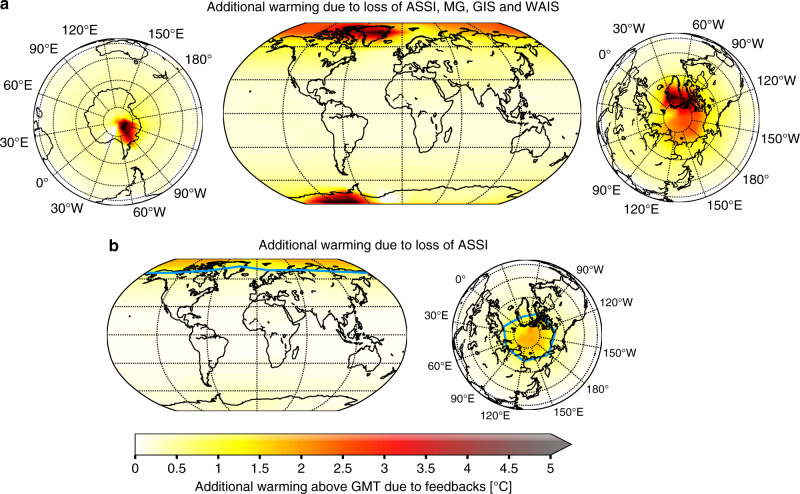
If reaching 1.5 °C (2.7 °F) would cause mountain glaciers, Greenland ice sheet and the WAIS to eventually disappear, and if the Arctic sea ice were to melt away every June, then this albedo loss and its second-order feedbacks causes additional warming in the graphic. While plausible, the loss of the ice sheets would take millennia.

The impact of ice-albedo feedback on temperature will intensify in the future as the Arctic sea ice decline is projected to become more pronounced, with a likely near-complete loss of sea ice cover (falling below 1 million km^{2}) at the end of the Arctic summer in September at least once before 2050 under all climate change scenarios, and around 2035 under the scenario of continually accelerating greenhouse gas emissions.

Since September marks the end of the Arctic summer, it also represents the nadir of sea ice cover in the present climate, with an annual recovery process beginning in the Arctic winter. Consecutive ice-free Septembers are considered highly unlikely in the near future, but their frequency will increase with greater levels of global warming: a 2018 paper estimated that an ice-free September would occur once in every 40 years under a warming of 1.5 °C (2.7 °F), but once in every 8 years under 2 °C (3.6 °F) and once in every 1.5 years under 3 °C (5.4 °F). This means that the loss of Arctic sea ice during September or earlier in the summer would not be irreversible, and in the scenarios where global warming begins to reverse, its annual frequency would begin to go down as well. As such, it is not considered one of the tipping points in the climate system.

Notably, while the loss of sea ice cover in September would be a historic event with significant implications for Arctic wildlife like polar bears, its impact on the ice-albedo feedback is relatively limited, as the total amount of solar energy received by the Arctic in September is already very low. On the other hand, even a relatively small reduction in June sea ice extent would have a far greater effect, since June represents the peak of the Arctic summer and the most intense transfer of solar energy.

CMIP5 models estimate that a total loss of Arctic sea ice cover from June to September would increase the global temperatures by 0.19 °C (0.34 °F), with a range of 0.16–0.21 °C, while the regional temperatures would increase by over 1.5 °C (2.7 °F). This estimate includes not just the ice-albedo feedback itself, but also its second-order effects such the impact of such sea ice loss on lapse rate feedback, the changes in water vapor concentrations and regional cloud feedbacks. Since these calculations are already part of every CMIP5 and CMIP6 model, they are also included in their warming projections under every climate change pathway, and do not represent a source of "additional" warming on top of their existing projections.

=== Long-term impact ===
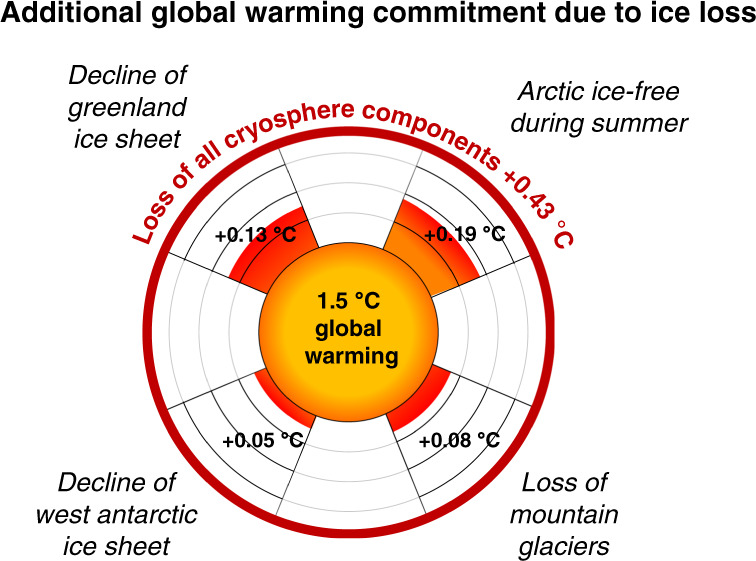
Global warming caused by the potential disappearance of the four notable ice masses and their albedo, assuming an average warming level of 1.5 °C (2.7 °F) throughout

Very high levels of global warming could prevent Arctic sea ice from reforming during the Arctic winter. Unlike an ice-free summer, this ice-free Arctic winter may represent an irreversible tipping point. It is most likely to occur at around 6.3 °C (11.3 °F), though it could potentially occur as early as 4.5 °C (8.1 °F) or as late as 8.7 °C (15.7 °F). While the Arctic sea ice would be gone for an entire year, it would only have an impact on the ice-albedo feedback during the months where sunlight is received by the Arctic - i.e. from March to September. The difference between this total loss of sea ice and its 1979 state is equivalent to a trillion tons of CO_{2} emissions - around 40% of the 2.39 trillion tons of cumulative emissions between 1850 and 2019, although around a quarter of this impact has already happened with the current sea ice loss. Relative to now, an ice-free winter would have a global warming impact of 0.6 °C (1.1 °F), with a regional warming between 0.6 °C (1.1 °F) and 1.2 °C (2.2 °F).

Ice–albedo feedback also occurs with the other large ice masses on the Earth's surface, such as mountain glaciers, Greenland ice sheet, West Antarctic and East Antarctic ice sheet. However, their large-scale melt is expected to take centuries or even millennia, and any loss in area between now and 2100 will be negligible. Thus, climate change models do not include them in their projections of 21st century climate change: experiments where they model their disappearance indicate that the total loss of the Greenland Ice Sheet adds 0.13 °C (0.23 °F) to global warming (with a range of 0.04–0.06 °C), while the loss of the West Antarctic Ice Sheet adds 0.05 °C (0.090 °F) (0.04–0.06 °C), and the loss of mountain glaciers adds 0.08 °C (0.14 °F) (0.07–0.09 °C). These estimates assume that global warming stays at an average of 1.5 °C (2.7 °F). Because of the logarithmic growth of greenhouse effect, the impact from ice loss would be larger at the slightly lower warming level of 2020s, but it would become lower if the warming proceeds towards higher levels.

Since the East Antarctic ice sheet would not be at risk of complete disappearance until the very high global warming of 5–10 °C (9.0–18.0 °F) is reached, and since its total melting is expected to take a minimum of 10,000 years to disappear entirely even then, it is rarely considered in such assessments. If it does happen, the maximum impact on global temperature is expected to be around 0.6 °C (1.1 °F). Total loss of the Greenland ice sheet would increase regional temperatures in the Arctic by between 0.5 °C (0.90 °F) and 3 °C (5.4 °F), while the regional temperature in Antarctica is likely to go up by 1 °C (1.8 °F) after the loss of the West Antarctic ice sheet and 2 °C (3.6 °F) after the loss of the East Antarctic ice sheet.

== Snow darkening effect ==
The effect of the ice-albedo feedback can be enhanced by the presence of light-absorbing particles. Airborne particles are deposited on snow and ice surfaces causing a darkening effect, with higher concentrations of particles causing a larger decrease in albedo. The lower albedo means that more solar radiation is absorbed and melting is accelerated. Particles that can cause darkening include black carbon and mineral dust. Microbial growth, such as snow algae on glaciers and ice algae on sea ice can also cause a snow darkening effect. Melting caused by algae increases the presence of liquid water in snow and ice surfaces, which then stimulates the growth of more snow and ice algae and causes a decrease in albedo, forming a positive feedback.

== Case Studies ==
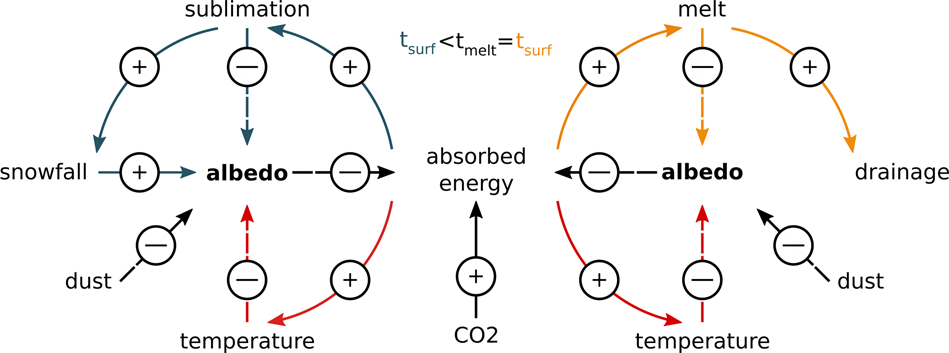
A diagram explaining the factors affecting ice-albedo feedback during the Snowball Earth period, with the focus on dust fluxes

=== Snowball Earth ===
The runaway ice–albedo feedback was also important for the formation of Snowball Earth – a climate state of a very cold Earth with practically complete ice cover. Paleoclimate evidence suggests that Snowball Earth began with the Sturtian glaciation about 717 million years ago. It persisted until about 660 mya, but it was followed by another Snowball period, Marinoan glaciation, only several million years later, which lasted until about 634 mya.

Geological evidence shows glaciers near the equator at the time, and models have suggested the ice–albedo feedback played a role. As more ice formed, more of the incoming solar radiation was reflected back into space, causing temperatures on Earth to drop. Whether the Earth was a complete solid snowball (completely frozen over), or a slush ball with a thin equatorial band of water still remains debated, but the ice–albedo feedback mechanism remains important for both cases.

Further, the end of the Snowball Earth periods would have also involved the ice-albedo feedback. It has been suggested that deglaciation began once enough dust from erosion had built up in layers on the snow-ice surface to substantially lower its albedo. This would have likely started in the midlatitude regions, as while they would have been colder than the tropics, they also receive less precipitation, and so there would have been less fresh snow to bury dust accumulation and restore the albedo. Once the midlatitudes would have lost enough ice, it would have not only helped to increase the planet-wide temperature, but the isostatic rebound would have had eventually led to enhanced volcanism and thus build-up of CO_{2}, which would have been impossible before.

=== The Siachen Glacier ===
The ice-albedo effect is important for the stability of the Siachen Glacier in the Karakorum range of the Himalayas. The glacier is a military zone in dispute between India and Pakistan, with operations continuing since 1984. As a result, anthropogenic pollution and debris has compromised the glacier's natural reflectivity, accelerating melting. Researchers have reported that the Siachen glacier has retreated by several kilometers since the beginning of the conflict in 1984. There are multiple specific factors to this observation.

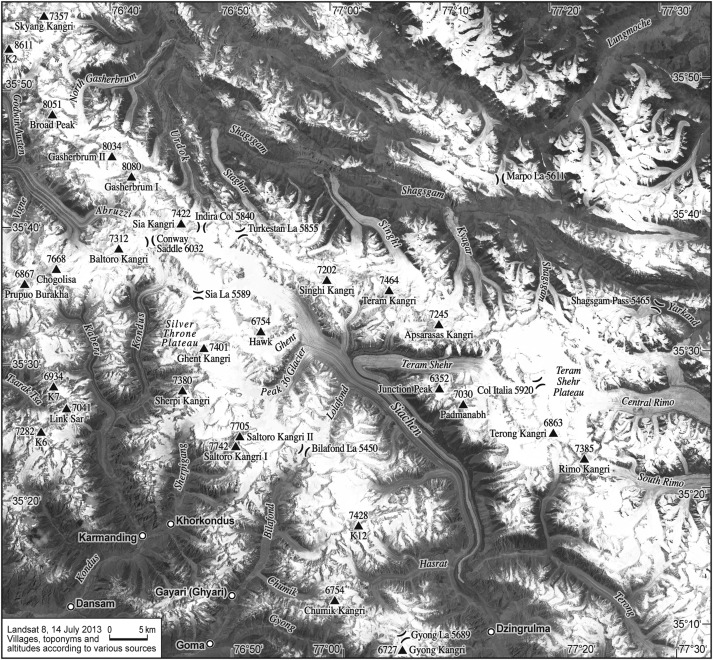
Siachen Glacier Satellite Capture

The extensive use of kerosene for heating, cooking, and melting ice for drinking water results in the constant deposition of black carbon (soot) across the glacier's surface. This particulate matter significantly lowers the ice's albedo, causing the glacier's surface to absorb more solar radiation, leading to accelerated melting even in extremely cold temperatures.

Beyond soot, the presence of soldiers has led to the accumulation of non-biodegradable waste, which includes plastics, metal scraps, and discarded equipment. These create "dirt cones", which act as localized melting points in where the debris traps heat.

=== The Swiss Alps ===
In the Swiss Alps, the ice-albedo effect plays a critical role in the recent rapid retreat of mountain glaciers. Satellite imagery in recent years have shown visually that bare-ice zones on Swiss glaciers have darkened. Researchers have noted that while albedo varies year to year, parts of the ablation areas have statistically significant negative albedo levels at about 0.05 per decade since the late twentieth century. Due to earlier melting of seasonal snow, darker underlying glacier ice and debris have been exposed for longer periods of time, thereby increasing the absorption of shortwave radiation.

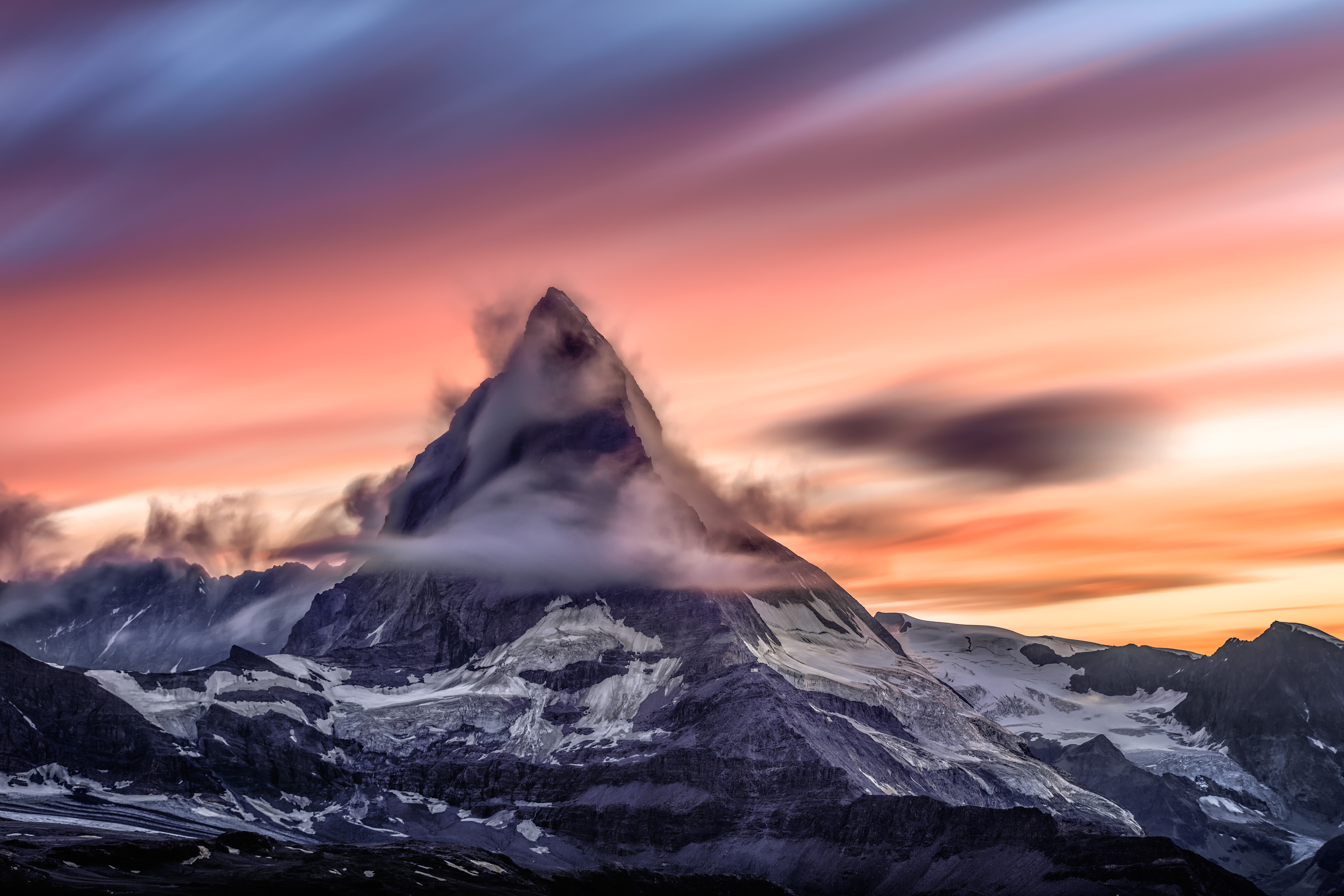
Matternhorn, Mountain in the Swiss Alps

Additionally, based on field and remote sensing data, researchers found substantial growth of pigmented glacier algae on bare ice in the European Alps. As the algal biomass increases, the surface reflectivity of the ice heightens, which leads to a larger amount of incoming solar radiation is absorbed rather than reflected. This exacerbates the melting process from temperature effects, further encouraging algae growth in a positive feedback loop.

== Ice–albedo feedback on exoplanets ==
On Earth, the climate is heavily influenced by interactions with solar radiation and feedback processes. One might expect exoplanets around other stars to also experience feedback processes caused by stellar radiation that affect the climate of the world. In modeling the climates of other planets, studies have shown that the ice–albedo feedback is much stronger on terrestrial planets that are orbiting stars (see: stellar classification) that have a high near-ultraviolet radiation.

== See also ==
- Causes of climate change
- Climate sensitivity
- Dark Snow Project
- Polar see-saw
