= Soil carbon feedback =

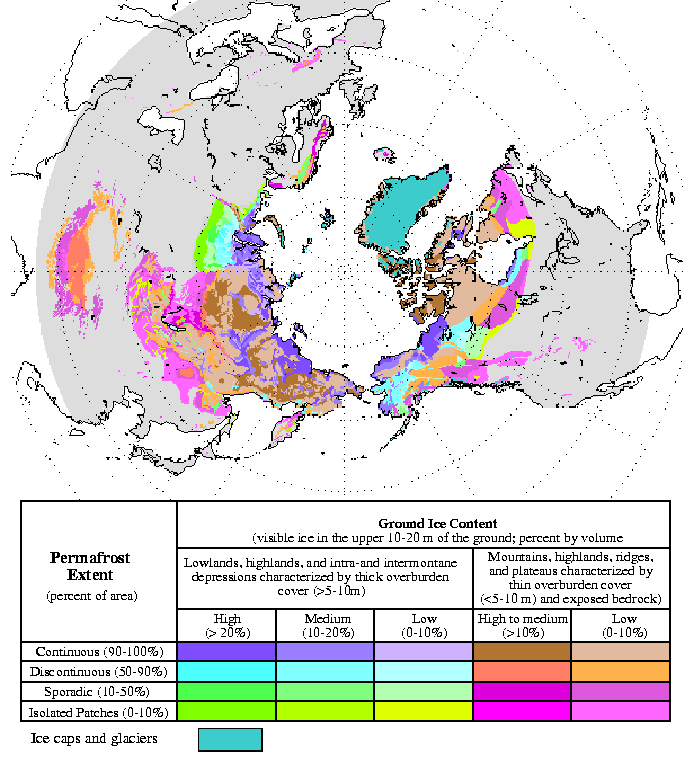
Map showing extent and types of permafrost in the Northern Hemisphere

The soil carbon feedback concerns the releases of carbon from soils in response to global warming. This response under climate change is a positive climate feedback. There is approximately two to three times more carbon in global soils than the Earth's atmosphere, which makes understanding this feedback crucial to understand future climate change. An increased rate of soil respiration is the main cause of this feedback, where measurements imply that 4 °C of warming increases annual soil respiration by up to 37%.

== Impact on climate change ==
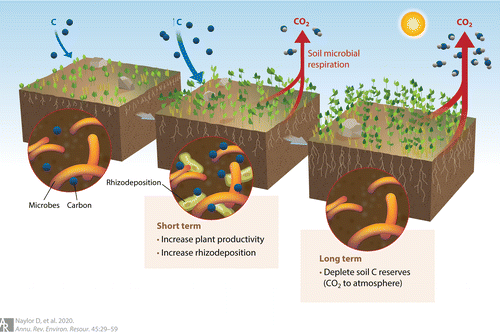
Impact of elevated CO_{2} on soil carbon reserves

An observation based study on future climate change, on the soil carbon feedback, conducted since 1991 in Harvard, suggests release of about 190 petagrams of soil carbon, the equivalent of the past two decades of greenhouse gas emissions from fossil fuel burning, until 2100 from the top 1-meter of Earth's soils, due to changes in microbial communities under elevated temperatures.

A 2018 study concludes, "Climate-driven losses of soil carbon are currently occurring across many ecosystems, with a detectable and sustained trend emerging at the global scale."

=== Permafrost ===
Thawing of permafrost (frozen ground), which is located in higher latitudes, the Arctic and sub-Arctic regions, suggest based on observational evidence a linear and chronic release of greenhouse gas emissions with ongoing climate change from these carbon dynamics.

=== Tipping point ===
A study published in 2011 identified a so-called compost-bomb instability, related to a tipping point with explosive soil carbon releases from peatlands. The authors noted that there is a unique stable soil carbon equilibrium for any fixed atmospheric temperature. Despite the prediction that the carbon balance of peatlands is going to shift from a sink to a source this century, peatland ecosystems are still omitted from the main Earth system models and integrated assessment models.

=== Uncertainties ===
Climate models do not account for effects of biochemical heat release associated with microbial decomposition. A limitation in our understanding of carbon cycling comes from the insufficient incorporation of soil animals, including insects and worms, and their interactions with microbial communities into global decomposition models.

== See also ==
- Ice–albedo feedback
- Polar amplification
- Biogeochemical cycle
- Weathering
- Soil regeneration
