= Polar amplification =

Climate effect

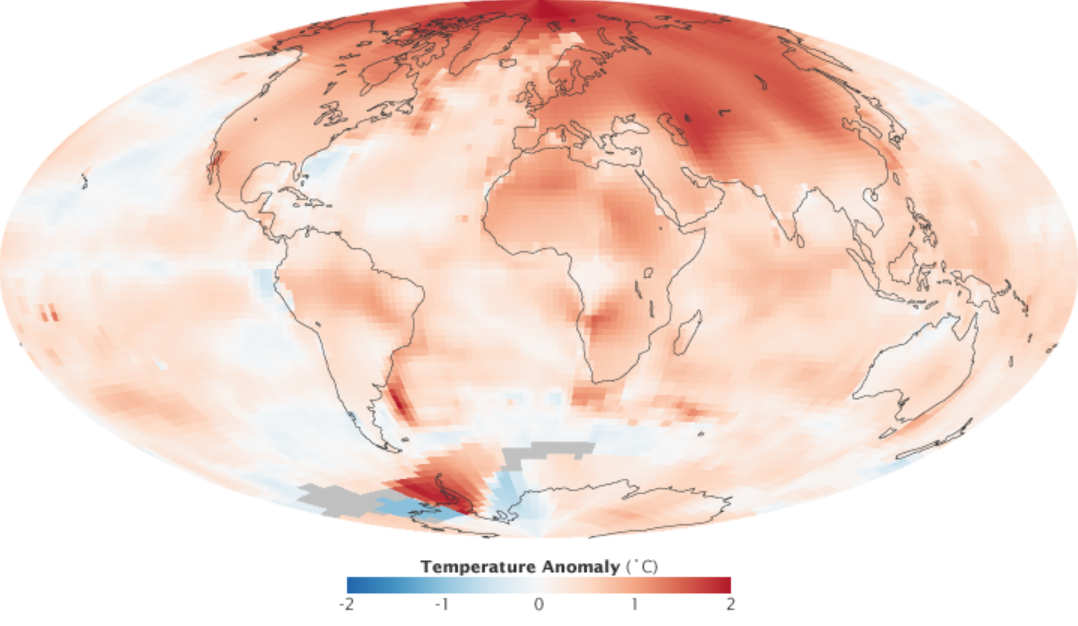
NASA GISS temperature trend 2000–2009, showing strong arctic amplification

Polar amplification is the phenomenon that any change in the net radiation balance (for example greenhouse intensification) tends to produce a larger change in temperature near the poles than in the planetary average. This is commonly referred to as the ratio of polar warming to tropical warming. On a planet with an atmosphere that can restrict emission of longwave radiation to space (a greenhouse effect), surface temperatures will be warmer than a simple planetary equilibrium temperature calculation would predict. Where the atmosphere or an extensive ocean is able to transport heat polewards, the poles will be warmer and equatorial regions cooler than their local net radiation balances would predict. The poles will experience the most cooling when the global-mean temperature is lower relative to a reference climate; alternatively, the poles will experience the greatest warming when the global-mean temperature is higher.

In the extreme, the planet Venus is thought to have experienced a very large increase in greenhouse effect over its lifetime, so much so that its poles have warmed sufficiently to render its surface temperature effectively isothermal (no difference between poles and equator). On Earth, water vapor and trace gasses provide a lesser greenhouse effect, and the atmosphere and extensive oceans provide efficient poleward heat transport. Both palaeoclimate changes and recent global warming changes have exhibited strong polar amplification, as described below.

Arctic amplification is polar amplification of the Earth's North Pole only; Antarctic amplification is that of the South Pole.

== History ==
An observation-based study related to Arctic amplification was published in 1969 by Mikhail Budyko, and the study conclusion has been summarized as "Sea ice loss affects Arctic temperatures through the surface albedo feedback." The same year, a similar model was published by William D. Sellers. Both studies attracted significant attention since they hinted at the possibility for a runaway positive feedback within the global climate system. In 1975, Manabe and Wetherald published the first somewhat plausible general circulation model that looked at the effects of an increase of greenhouse gas. Although confined to less than one-third of the globe, with a "swamp" ocean and only land surface at high latitudes, it showed an Arctic warming faster than the tropics (as have all subsequent models).

== Amplification ==
=== Amplifying mechanisms ===
Feedbacks associated with sea ice and snow cover are widely cited as one of the principal causes of terrestrial polar amplification. These feedbacks are particularly noted in local polar amplification, although recent work has shown that the lapse rate feedback is likely equally important to the ice-albedo feedback for Arctic amplification. Supporting this idea, large-scale amplification is also observed in model worlds with no ice or snow. It appears to arise both from a (possibly transient) intensification of poleward heat transport and more directly from changes in the local net radiation balance. Local radiation balance is crucial because an overall decrease in outgoing longwave radiation will produce a larger relative increase in net radiation near the poles than near the equator. Thus, between the lapse rate feedback and changes in the local radiation balance, much of polar amplification can be attributed to changes in outgoing longwave radiation. This is especially true for the Arctic, whereas the elevated terrain in Antarctica limits the influence of the lapse rate feedback.

Some examples of climate system feedbacks thought to contribute to recent polar amplification include the reduction of snow cover and sea ice, changes in atmospheric and ocean circulation, the presence of anthropogenic soot in the Arctic environment, and increases in cloud cover and water vapor. CO_{2} forcing has also been attributed to polar amplification. Most studies connect sea ice changes to polar amplification. Both ice extent and thickness impact polar amplification. Climate models with smaller baseline sea ice extent and thinner sea ice coverage exhibit stronger polar amplification. Some models of modern climate exhibit Arctic amplification without changes in snow and ice cover.

The individual processes contributing to polar warming are critical to understanding climate sensitivity. Polar warming also affects many ecosystems, including marine and terrestrial ecosystems, climate systems, and human populations. Polar amplification is largely driven by local polar processes with hardly any remote forcing, whereas polar warming is regulated by tropical and midlatitude forcing. These impacts of polar amplification have led to continuous research in the face of global warming.

=== Ocean circulation ===
It has been estimated that 70% of global wind energy is transferred to the ocean and takes place within the Antarctic Circumpolar Current (ACC). Eventually, upwelling due to wind-stress transports cold Antarctic waters through the Atlantic surface current, while warming them over the equator, and into the Arctic environment. This is especially noticed in high latitudes. Thus, warming in the Arctic depends on the efficiency of the global ocean transport and plays a role in the polar see-saw effect.

Decreased oxygen and low-pH during La Niña are processes that correlate with decreased primary production and a more pronounced poleward flow of ocean currents. It has been proposed that the mechanism of increased Arctic surface air temperature anomalies during La Niña periods of ENSO may be attributed to the Tropically Excited Arctic Warming Mechanism (TEAM), when Rossby waves propagate more poleward, leading to wave dynamics and an increase in downward infrared radiation.

=== Amplification factor ===
Polar amplification is quantified in terms of a polar amplification factor, generally defined as the ratio of some change in a polar temperature to a corresponding change in a broader average temperature:

${ PAF }={\Delta{T}_{p}\over\Delta\overline{T}}$ ,

where $\Delta{T}_{p}$ is a change in polar temperature and $\Delta\overline{T}$ is, for example, a corresponding change in a global mean temperature.

Common implementations define the temperature changes directly as the anomalies in surface air temperature relative to a recent reference interval (typically 30 years). Others have used the ratio of the variances of surface air temperature over an extended interval.

=== Amplification phase ===
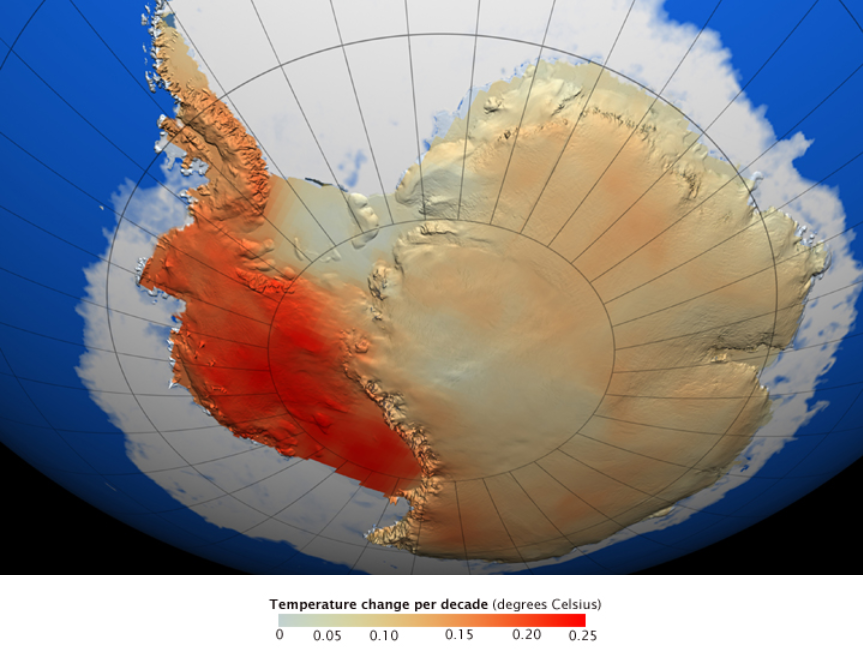
Temperature trends in West Antarctica (left) have greatly exceeded the global average; East Antarctica less so.

It is observed that Arctic and Antarctic warming commonly proceed out of phase because of orbital forcing, resulting in the so-called polar see-saw effect.

== Paleoclimate polar amplification ==
The glacial / interglacial cycles of the Pleistocene provide extensive palaeoclimate evidence of polar amplification, both from the Arctic and the Antarctic. In particular, the temperature rise since the Last Glacial Maximum 20,000 years ago provides a clear picture. Proxy temperature records from the Arctic (Greenland) and from the Antarctic indicate polar amplification factors on the order of 2.0.

== Recent Arctic amplification ==
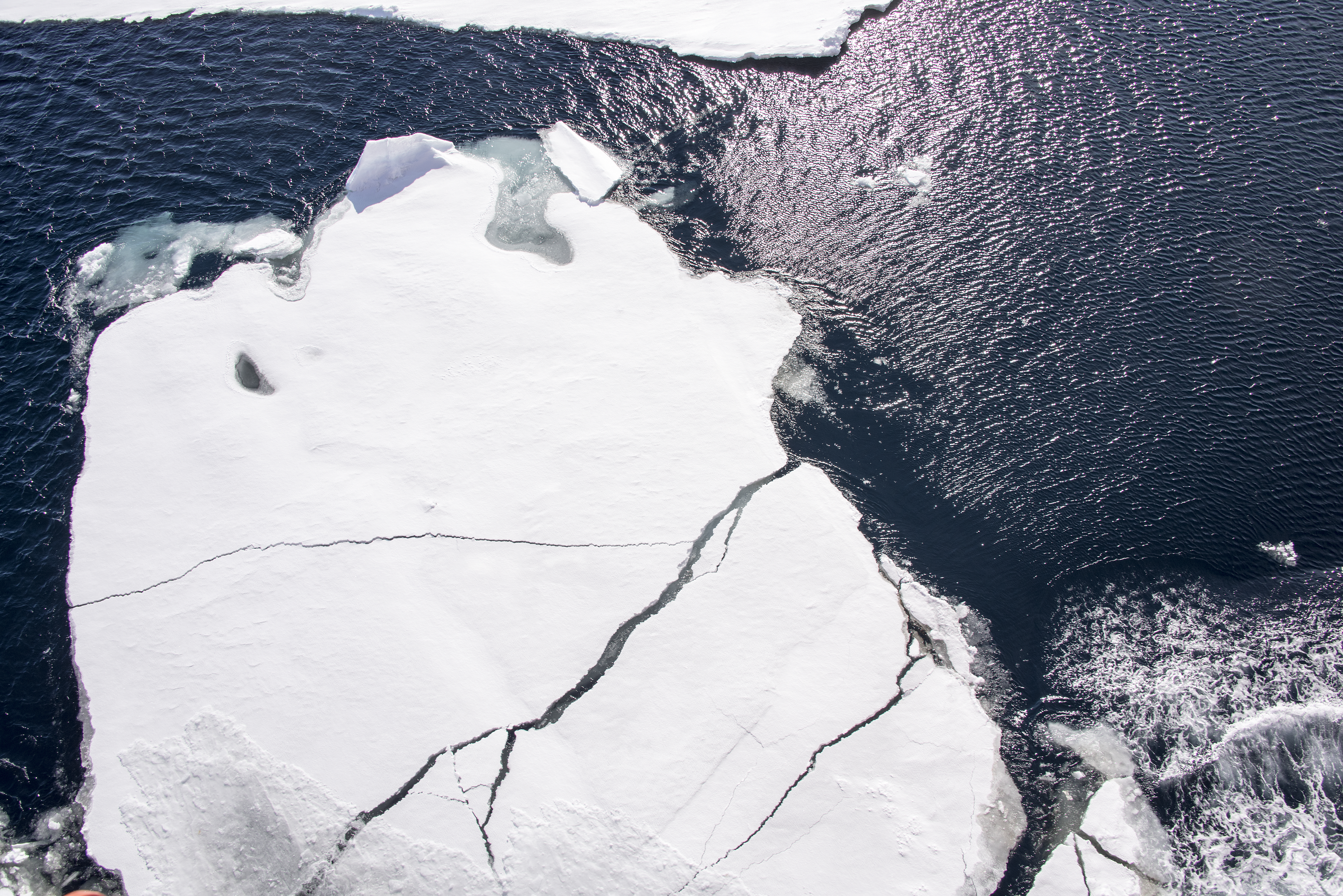
The dark ocean surface reflects only 6 percent of incoming solar radiation, while sea ice reflects 50 to 70 percent.

Suggested mechanisms leading to the observed Arctic amplification include Arctic sea ice decline (open water reflects less sunlight than sea ice), atmospheric heat transport from the equator to the Arctic, and the lapse rate feedback.

The Arctic was historically described as warming twice as fast as the global average, but this estimate was based on older observations which missed the more recent acceleration. By 2021, enough data was available to show that the Arctic had warmed three times as fast as the globe - 3.1°C between 1971 and 2019, as opposed to the global warming of 1°C over the same period. Moreover, this estimate defines the Arctic as everything above 60th parallel north, or a full third of the Northern Hemisphere: in 2021–2022, it was found that since 1979, the warming within the Arctic Circle itself (above the 66th parallel) has been nearly four times faster than the global average. Within the Arctic Circle itself, even greater Arctic amplification occurs in the Barents Sea area, with hotspots around West Spitsbergen Current: weather stations located on its path record decadal warming up to seven times faster than the global average. This has fuelled concerns that unlike the rest of the Arctic sea ice, ice cover in the Barents Sea may permanently disappear even around 1.5 degrees of global warming.

The acceleration of Arctic amplification has not been linear: a 2022 analysis found that it occurred in two sharp steps, with the former around 1986, and the latter after 2000. The first acceleration is attributed to the increase in anthropogenic radiative forcing in the region, which is in turn likely connected to the reductions in stratospheric sulfur aerosols pollution in Europe in the 1980s in order to combat acid rain. Since sulphate aerosols have a cooling effect, their absence is likely to have increased Arctic temperatures by up to 0.5 degrees Celsius. The second acceleration has no known cause, which is why it did not show up in any climate models. It is likely to be an example of multi-decadal natural variability, like the suggested link between Arctic temperatures and Atlantic Multi-decadal Oscillation (AMO), in which case it can be expected to reverse in the future. However, even the first increase in Arctic amplification was only accurately simulated by a fraction of the current CMIP6 models. Recent studies show the Arctic has warmed nearly four times faster than the global average since 1979, with areas like the Barents Sea experiencing rates up to seven times higher, highlighting the urgent need to address polar climate change.

=== Possible impacts on mid-latitude weather ===
Since the early 2000s, climate models have consistently identified that global warming will gradually push jet streams poleward. In 2008, this was confirmed by observational evidence, which proved that from 1979 to 2001, the northern jet stream moved northward at an average rate of 2.01 kilometres (1.25 mi) per year, with a similar trend in the southern hemisphere jet stream. Climate scientists have hypothesized that the jet stream will also gradually weaken as a result of global warming. Trends such as Arctic sea ice decline, reduced snow cover, evapotranspiration patterns, and other weather anomalies have caused the Arctic to heat up faster than other parts of the globe, in what is known as the Arctic amplification. In 2021–2022, it was found that since 1979, the warming within the Arctic Circle has been nearly four times faster than the global average, and some hotspots in the Barents Sea area warmed up to seven times faster than the global average. While the Arctic remains one of the coldest places on Earth today, the temperature gradient between it and the warmer parts of the globe will continue to diminish with every decade of global warming as the result of this amplification. If this gradient has a strong influence on the jet stream, then it will eventually become weaker and more variable in its course, which would allow more cold air from the polar vortex to leak mid-latitudes and slow the progression of Rossby waves, leading to more persistent and more extreme weather.

The hypothesis above is closely associated with Jennifer Francis, who had first proposed it in a 2012 paper co-authored by Stephen J. Vavrus. While some paleoclimate reconstructions have suggested that the polar vortex becomes more variable and causes more unstable weather during periods of warming back in 1997, this was contradicted by climate modelling, with PMIP2 simulations finding in 2010 that the Arctic Oscillation (AO) was much weaker and more negative during the Last Glacial Maximum, and suggesting that warmer periods have stronger positive phase AO, and thus less frequent leaks of the polar vortex air. However, a 2012 review in the Journal of the Atmospheric Sciences noted that "there [has been] a significant change in the vortex mean state over the twenty-first century, resulting in a weaker, more disturbed vortex.", which contradicted the modelling results but fit the Francis-Vavrus hypothesis. Additionally, a 2013 study noted that the then-current CMIP5 tended to strongly underestimate winter blocking trends, and other 2012 research had suggested a connection between declining Arctic sea ice and heavy snowfall during midlatitude winters.

In 2013, further research from Francis connected reductions in the Arctic sea ice to extreme summer weather in the northern mid-latitudes, while other research from that year identified potential linkages between Arctic sea ice trends and more extreme rainfall in the European summer. At the time, it was also suggested that this connection between Arctic amplification and jet stream patterns was involved in the formation of Hurricane Sandy and played a role in the early 2014 North American cold wave. In 2015, Francis' next study concluded that highly amplified jet-stream patterns are occurring more frequently in the past two decades. Hence, continued heat-trapping emissions favour increased formation of extreme events caused by prolonged weather conditions.

Studies published in 2017 and 2018 identified stalling patterns of Rossby waves in the northern hemisphere jet stream as the culprit behind other almost stationary extreme weather events, such as the 2018 European heatwave, the 2003 European heat wave, 2010 Russian heat wave or the 2010 Pakistan floods, and suggested that these patterns were all connected to Arctic amplification. Further work from Francis and Vavrus that year suggested that amplified Arctic warming is observed as stronger in lower atmospheric areas because the expanding process of warmer air increases pressure levels which decreases poleward geopotential height gradients. As these gradients are the reason that cause west to east winds through the thermal wind relationship, declining speeds are usually found south of the areas with geopotential increases. In 2017, Francis explained her findings to the Scientific American: "A lot more water vapor is being transported northward by big swings in the jet stream. That's important because water vapor is a greenhouse gas just like carbon dioxide and methane. It traps heat in the atmosphere. That vapor also condenses as droplets we know as clouds, which themselves trap more heat. The vapor is a big part of the amplification story—a big reason the Arctic is warming faster than anywhere else."

In a 2017 study conducted by climatologist Judah Cohen and several of his research associates, Cohen wrote that "[the] shift in polar vortex states can account for most of the recent winter cooling trends over Eurasian midlatitudes". A 2018 paper from Vavrus and others linked Arctic amplification to more persistent hot-dry extremes during the midlatitude summers, as well as the midlatitude winter continental cooling. Another 2017 paper estimated that when the Arctic experiences anomalous warming, primary production in North America goes down by between 1% and 4% on average, with some states suffering up to 20% losses. A 2021 study found that a stratospheric polar vortex disruption is linked with extreme cold winter weather across parts of Asia and North America, including the February 2021 North American cold wave. Another 2021 study identified a connection between the Arctic sea ice loss and the increased size of wildfires in the Western United States.

However, because the specific observations are considered short-term observations, there is considerable uncertainty in the conclusions. Climatology observations require several decades to definitively distinguish various forms of natural variability from climate trends. This point was stressed by reviews in 2013 and in 2017. A study in 2014 concluded that Arctic amplification significantly decreased cold-season temperature variability over the northern hemisphere in recent decades. Cold Arctic air intrudes into the warmer lower latitudes more rapidly today during autumn and winter, a trend projected to continue in the future except during summer, thus calling into question whether winters will bring more cold extremes. A 2019 analysis of a data set collected from 35 182 weather stations worldwide, including 9116 whose records go beyond 50 years, found a sharp decrease in northern midlatitude cold waves since the 1980s.

Moreover, a range of long-term observational data collected during the 2010s and published in 2020 suggests that the intensification of Arctic amplification since the early 2010s was not linked to significant changes on mid-latitude atmospheric patterns. State-of-the-art modelling research of PAMIP (Polar Amplification Model Intercomparison Project) improved upon the 2010 findings of PMIP2; it found that sea ice decline would weaken the jet stream and increase the probability of atmospheric blocking, but the connection was very minor, and typically insignificant next to interannual variability. In 2022, a follow-up study found that while the PAMIP average had likely underestimated the weakening caused by sea ice decline by 1.2 to 3 times, even the corrected connection still amounts to only 10% of the jet stream's natural variability.

Additionally, a 2021 study found that while jet streams had indeed slowly moved polewards since 1960 as was predicted by models, they did not weaken, in spite of a small increase in waviness. A 2022 re-analysis of the aircraft observational data collected over 2002–2020 suggested that the North Atlantic jet stream had actually strengthened. Finally, a 2021 study was able to reconstruct jet stream patterns over the past 1,250 years based on Greenland ice cores, and found that all of the recently observed changes remain within range of natural variability: the earliest likely time of divergence is in 2060, under the Representative Concentration Pathway 8.5 which implies continually accelerating greenhouse gas emissions.

== See also ==
- Arctic dipole anomaly
- Arctic oscillation
- Climate of the Arctic
- Polar vortex
- Sudden stratospheric warming
