= Polar see-saw =

Climatological phenomenon

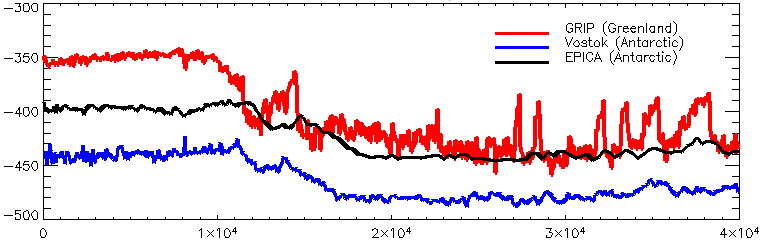
The warming during the Younger Dryas is out of phase between the two hemispheres.

The polar see-saw (also known as bipolar seesaw) is the phenomenon in which temperature changes in the northern and southern hemispheres may be out of phase. The hypothesis states that large changes, for example when the glaciers are intensely growing or depleting, in the formation of ocean bottom water in both poles take a long time to exert their effect in the other hemisphere. Estimates of the period of delay vary; one typical estimate is 1,500 years. This is usually studied in the context of ice cores taken from Antarctica and Greenland.

== See also ==
- Polar amplification
- Climate of the Arctic
- Climate of Antarctica
