= William D. Sellers =

American meteorologist and climate scientist

- Born: August 18, 1928; Culver City, California, United States
- Died: August 27, 2014 (aged 86); Tucson, Arizona, United States
- Education: UCLA (B.A.); Massachusetts Institute of Technology (M.S.; ScD, 1957)
- Known for: Numerical Weather Prediction; Meteorology; Climatology
- Scientific career
- Fields: Meteorology
- Workplaces: University of Arizona
- Doctoral advisor: Edward Lorenz

William D. Sellers (18 August 1928 – 27 August 2014) was an American meteorologist, climate scientist, and pioneer of climate modelling. He created one the earliest climate models and was one of the first scientists to recognize the effects of CO_{2} in the atmosphere on the Earth's climate. He published the textbook "Physical Climatology".

== Biography ==
Sellers was born in Culver City, California on August 18, 1928. After receiving his bachelor's degree from UCLA he earned both his master's and doctorate degree in Meteorology from Massachusetts Institute of Technology. His thesis adviser was Edward Lorenz. In 1965 he published the book "Physical Climatology". Celebrating the books's 25th anniversary, J. Graham Cogley wrote of Sellers and Russian climatologist Mikhail Budyko's work:

"These works have been tremendously influential upon the thinking of most climatologists, and have been invaluable in explaining the atmospheric engine to several generations of students. Most of the changes which we expect in our world in the near future will involve some aspect of physical climatology."

As Professor Emeritus at the University of Arizona, Sellers retired in 1997.

== See also ==
- Meteorology
- Numerical weather prediction
- El Niño–Southern Oscillation

== Publications ==
A selection of Sellers books and Journal Publications:

- 1965 Physical Climatology.
- 1969 A global climatic model based on the energy balance of the Earth-atmosphere system. Journal of Applied Meteorology Vol. 8
- 1973 A new global climatic model. Journal of Applied Meteorology Vol. 12
- 1974 A reassessment of the effect of CO_{2} variations on a simple global climate model. Journal of Applied Meteorology Vol. 13
- 1988 El Niño and its effect on precipitation in Arizona and western New Mexico. Journal of Climatology Vol. 8
