= Extinction risk from climate change =

Risk of plant or animal species becoming extinct due to climate change

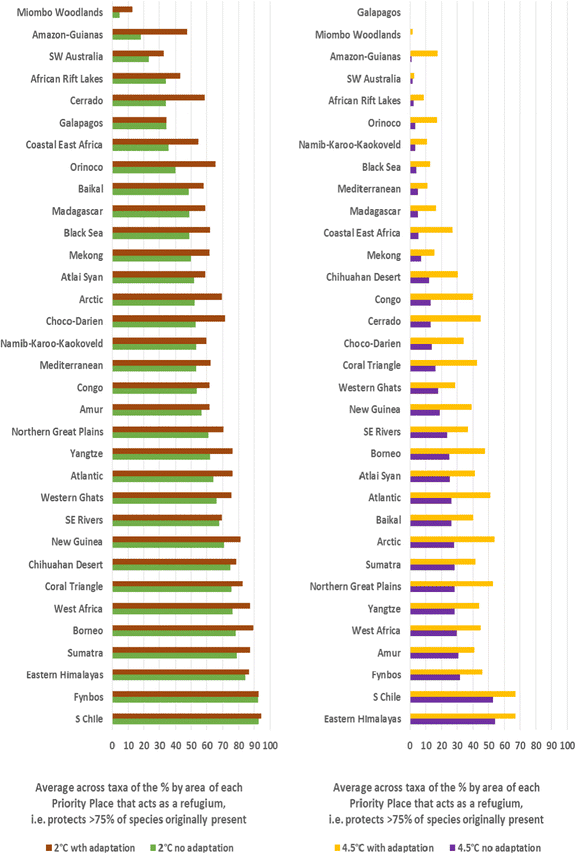
Relative to now, key areas for wildlife will retain less of their biodiversity under 2 °C (3.6 °F) of global warming, and even less under 4.5 °C (8.1 °F).

There are several plausible pathways that could lead to plant and animal species extinction from climate change. Every species has evolved to exist within a certain ecological niche, but climate change leads to changes of temperature and average weather patterns. These changes can push climatic conditions outside of the species' niche, and ultimately render it extinct. Normally, species faced with changing conditions can either adapt in place through microevolution or move to another habitat with suitable conditions. However, the speed of recent climate change is very fast. Due to this rapid change, for example cold-blooded animals (a category which includes amphibians, reptiles and all invertebrates) may struggle to find a suitable habitat within 50 km of their current location at the end of this century (for a mid-range scenario of future global warming).

Climate change also increases both the frequency and intensity of extreme weather events, which can directly wipe out regional populations of species. Those species occupying coastal and low-lying island habitats can also become extinct by sea level rise. This has already happened with Bramble Cay melomys in Australia, which was the first mammal to go extinct due to human-induced sea level rise, with the Australian government officially confirming its extinction in 2019.

Climate change has been linked with the increased prevalence and global spread of infectious diseases affecting wildlife. This includes Batrachochytrium dendrobatidis, a fungus that is one of the main drivers of the worldwide decline in amphibian populations.

So far, climate change has not yet been a major contributor to the ongoing holocene extinction. In fact, nearly all of the irreversible biodiversity loss to date has been caused by other anthropogenic pressures such as habitat destruction. Yet, its effects are certain to become more prevalent in the future. As of 2021, 19% of species on the IUCN Red List of Threatened Species are already being impacted by climate change. Out of 4000 species analyzed by the IPCC Sixth Assessment Report, half were found to have shifted their distribution to higher latitudes or elevations in response to climate change. According to IUCN, once a species has lost over half of its geographic range, it is classified as "endangered", which is considered equivalent to a >20% likelihood of extinction over the next 10–100 years. If it loses 80% or more of its range, it is considered "critically endangered", and has a very high (over 50%) likelihood of going extinct over the next 10–100 years.

The IPCC Sixth Assessment Report projected that in the future, 9%-14% of the species assessed would be at a very high risk of extinction under 1.5 °C (2.7 °F) of global warming over the preindustrial levels, and more warming means more widespread risk, with 3 °C (5.4 °F) placing 12%-29% at very high risk, and 5 °C (9.0 °F) 15%-48%. In particular, at 3.2 °C (5.8 °F), 15% of invertebrates (including 12% of pollinators), 11% of amphibians and 10% of flowering plants would be at a very high risk of extinction, while ~49% of insects, 44% of plants, and 26% of vertebrates would be at a high risk of extinction. In contrast, even the more modest Paris Agreement goal of limiting warming to 2 °C (3.6 °F) reduces the fraction of invertebrates, amphibians and flowering plants at a very high risk of extinction to below 3%. However, while the more ambitious 1.5 °C (2.7 °F) goal dramatically cuts the proportion of insects, plants, and vertebrates at high risk of extinction to 6%, 4% and 8%, the less ambitious target triples (to 18%) and doubles (8% and 16%) the proportion of respective species at risk.

== Causes ==
Projections of extreme weather under different levels of global warming

Climate change has already adversely affected marine and terrestrial ecoregions, including tundras, mangroves, coral reefs, and caves. Consequently, increasing global temperatures have already been pushing some species out of their habitats for decades.

When the IPCC Fourth Assessment Report was published in 2007, expert assessments concluded that over the last three decades, human-induced warming had likely had a discernible influence on many physical and biological systems, and that regional temperature trends had already affected species and ecosystems around the world. By the time of the Sixth Assessment Report, it was found that for all species for which long-term records are available, half have shifted their ranges poleward (and/or upward for mountain species), while two-thirds have had their spring events occur earlier.

Many of the species at risk are Arctic and Antarctic fauna such as polar bears In the Arctic, the waters of Hudson Bay are ice-free for three weeks longer than they were thirty years ago, affecting polar bears, which prefer to hunt on sea ice. Species that rely on cold weather conditions such as gyrfalcons, and snowy owls that prey on lemmings that use the cold winter to their advantage may be negatively affected. Climate change is also leading to a mismatch between the snow camouflage of arctic animals such as snowshoe hares with the increasingly snow-free landscape.

Then, many species of freshwater and saltwater plants and animals are dependent on glacier-fed waters to ensure a cold water habitat that they have adapted to. Some species of freshwater fish need cold water to survive and to reproduce, and this is especially true with salmon and cutthroat trout. Reduced glacier runoff can lead to insufficient stream flow to allow these species to thrive. Ocean krill, a cornerstone species, prefer cold water and are the primary food source for aquatic mammals such as the blue whale. Marine invertebrates achieve peak growth at the temperatures they have adapted to, and cold-blooded animals found at high latitudes and altitudes generally grow faster to compensate for the short growing season. Warmer-than-ideal conditions result in higher metabolism and consequent reductions in body size despite increased foraging, which in turn elevates the risk of predation. Indeed, even a slight increase in temperature during development impairs growth efficiency and survival rate in rainbow trout.

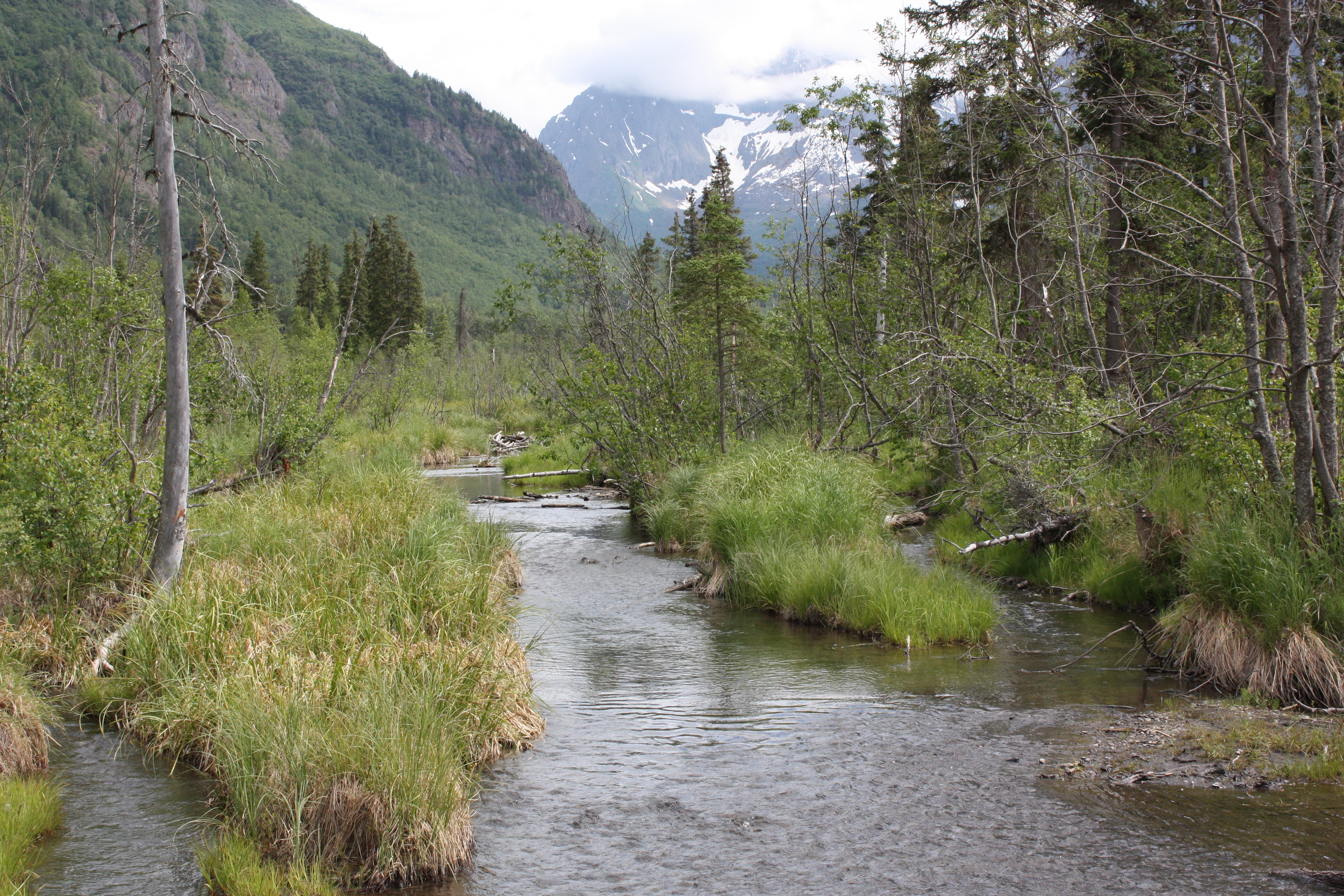
Eagle River in central Alaska, home to various indigenous freshwater species

Species of fish living in cold or cool water can see a reduction in population of up to 50% in the majority of U.S. freshwater streams, according to most climate change models. The increase in metabolic demands due to higher water temperatures, in combination with decreasing amounts of food will be the main contributors to their decline. Additionally, many fish species (such as salmon) use seasonal water levels of streams as a means of reproducing, typically breeding when water flow is high and migrating to the ocean after spawning. Because snowfall is expected to be reduced due to climate change, water runoff is expected to decrease which leads to lower flowing streams, affecting the spawning of millions of salmon. To add to this, rising seas will begin to flood coastal river systems, converting them from fresh water habitats to saline environments where indigenous species will likely perish. In southeast Alaska, the sea rises by 3.96 cm/year, redepositing sediment in various river channels and bringing salt water inland. This rise in sea level not only contaminates streams and rivers with saline water, but also the reservoirs they are connected to, where species such as sockeye salmon live. Although this species of Salmon can survive in both salt and fresh water, the loss of a body of fresh water stops them from reproducing in the spring, as the spawning process requires fresh water.

Furthermore, climate change may disrupt ecological partnerships among interacting species, via changes on behaviour and phenology, or via climate niche mismatch. The disruption of species-species associations is a potential consequence of climate-driven movements of each individual species towards opposite directions. Climate change may, thus, lead to another extinction, more silent and mostly overlooked: the extinction of species' interactions. As a consequence of the spatial decoupling of species-species associations, ecosystem services derived from biotic interactions are also at risk from climate niche mismatch. Whole ecosystem disruptions will occur earlier under more intense climate change: under the high-emissions RCP8.5 scenario, ecosystems in the tropical oceans would be the first to experience abrupt disruption before 2030, with tropical forests and polar environments following by 2050. In total, 15% of ecological assemblages would have over 20% of their species abruptly disrupted if as warming eventually reaches 4 °C (7.2 °F); in contrast, this would happen to fewer than 2% if the warming were to stay below 2 °C (3.6 °F).

=== Extinctions attributed to climate change ===
Besides Bramble Cay melomys (see below), few recorded species extinctions are thought to have been caused by climate change, as opposed to the other drivers of the Holocene extinction. For example, only 20 of 864 species extinctions are considered by the IUCN to potentially be the result of climate change, either wholly or in part, and the evidence linking them to climate change is typically considered as weak or insubstantial. These species' extinctions are listed in the table below.

Causes of global extinction for 20 species whose declines were possibly linked to climate change (data from IUCN)
Higher taxon	Species	Possible link to climate change	Hypothesized causes of extinction
Snail	Graecoanatolica macedonica	Drought	Loss of aquatic habitat due to drought
Snail	Pachnodus velutinus	Drought	Habitat degradation, drought related to climate change, hybridization
Snail	Pseudamnicola desertorum	Possibly related to drought	Loss of aquatic habitat
Snail	Rhachistia aldabrae	Drought	Drought related to recent climate change
Fish* (Note: Acanthobrama telavivensis and Anaxyrus (Bufo) baxteri are extinct in the wild rather than globally extinct.)	Acanthobrama telavivensis	Drought	Loss of aquatic habitat
Fish	Tristramella magdelainae	Drought	Loss of aquatic habitat due to drought, pollution and water extraction
Frog*	Anaxyrus (Bufo) baxteri	Chytrid	Chytrid fungus
Frog	Atelopus ignescens	Chytrid	Synergistic effects of chytrid and climate change
Frog	Atelopus longirostris	Chytrid	Chytrid, climate change, pollution, and habitat loss
Frog	Craugastor chrysozetetes	Chytrid	Habitat modification and chytrid
Frog	Craugastor escoces	Chytrid	Chytrid, possibly associated with climate change
Frog	Incilius (Bufo) holdridgei	Chytrid	Chytrid, possibly associated with climate change
Frog	Incilius (Bufo) periglenes	Chytrid	Global warming, chytrid, and pollution
Bird	Fregilupus varius	Drought	Introduced disease, over-harvesting, forest fires, drought, deforestation
Bird	Gallirallus wakensis	Storms	Overharvesting and occasional inundation of island due to storms
Bird	Moho braccatus	Storms	Habitat destruction, introduced predators and diseases, and hurricanes
Bird	Myadestes myadestinus	Storms	Habitat destruction, introduced predators and diseases, and hurricanes
Bird	Porzana palmeri	Storms	Habitat destruction and predation by introduced species, storms
Bird	Psephotus pulcherrimus	Drought	Drought and overgrazing reduced food supply, other factors include introduced species, disease, habitat destruction, and overharvesting
Rodent	Geocapromys thoracatus	Storm	Introduced predators, storm

However, there is abundant evidence for local extinctions from contractions at the warm edges of species' ranges. Hundreds of animal species have been documented to shift their range (usually polewards and upwards) as a signal of biotic change due to climate warming. Warm-edge populations tend to be the most logical place to search for causes of climate-related extinctions since these species may already be at the limits of their climatic tolerances. This pattern of warm-edge contraction provides indications that many local extinctions have already occurred as a result of climate change. Further, an Australian review of 519 observational studies over 74 years found more than 100 cases where extreme weather events reduced animal species abundance by over 25%, including 31 cases of complete local extirpation. 60% of the studies followed the ecosystem for over a year, and populations did not recover to pre-disturbance levels in 38% of the cases.

== Extinction risk estimates for all species ==
=== Initial estimate ===
The first major attempt to estimate the impact of climate change on generalized species' extinction risks was published in the journal Nature in 2004. It suggested that between 15% and 37% of 1103 endemic or near-endemic known plant and animal species around the world would be "committed to extinction" by 2050, as their habitat will no longer be able to support their survival range by then. However, there was limited knowledge at the time about the species' average ability to disperse or otherwise adapt in response to climate change, and about the minimum average area needed for their persistence, which limited the reliability of their estimate in the eyes of the scientific community. In response, another 2004 paper found that different, yet still plausible assumptions about those factors could result in as few as 5.6% or as many as 78.6% of those 1103 species being committed to extinction, although this was disputed by the original authors.

=== Major reports, reviews and surveys ===
Between 2005 and 2011, 74 studies analyzing the impact of climate change on various species' extinction risk were published. A 2011 review of those studies found that on average, they projected the loss of 11.2% of species by 2100. However, the average of predictions based on the extrapolation of observed responses was 14.7%, while the model-based estimates were at 6.7%. Further, when using IUCN criteria, 7.6% of species would become threatened based on model predictions, yet 31.7% based on extrapolated observations. The following year, this mismatch between models and observations was primarily attributed to the models failing to properly account for different rates of species relocation and for the emerging competition among species, thus causing them to underestimate extinction risk.

In 2019, Global Assessment Report on Biodiversity and Ecosystem Services from Intergovernmental Science-Policy Platform on Biodiversity and Ecosystem Services (IPBES) estimated that there are 8 million animal and plant species, including 5.5 million insect species. It found that one million species, including 40 percent of amphibians, almost a third of reef-building corals, more than a third of marine mammals, and 10 percent of all insects are threatened with extinction due to five main stressors. The land use change and sea use change was considered the most important stressor, followed by direct exploitation of organisms (i.e. overfishing). Climate change ranked third, followed by pollution and invasive species. The report concluded that global warming of 2 °C (3.6 °F) over the preindustrial levels would threaten an estimated 5% of all the Earth's species with extinction even in the absence of the other four factors, while if the warming reached 4.3 °C (7.7 °F), 16% of the Earth's species would be threatened with extinction. Finally, even the lower warming levels of 1.5–2 °C (2.7–3.6 °F) would "profoundly" reduce geographical ranges of the majority of the world's species, thus making them more vulnerable than they would have been otherwise.

February 2022 IPCC Sixth Assessment Report included median and maximum estimates of the percentage of species at high risk of extinction for every level of warming, with the maximum estimates increasing much more than the medians. For instance, for 1.5 °C (2.7 °F), the median was 9% and the maximum 14%, for 2 °C (3.6 °F) the median was 10% and the maximum 18%, for 3 °C (5.4 °F) the median was 12% and the maximum 29%, for 4 °C (7.2 °F) the median was 13% and the maximum 39%, and for 5 °C (9.0 °F) the median was 15% but the maximum 48% at 5 °C.

In July 2022, a survey of 3331 biodiversity experts estimated that since the year 1500, around 30% (between 16% and 50%) of all species have been threatened with extinction – including the species which had already gone extinct. With regards to climate change, the experts estimated that 2 °C (3.6 °F) threatens or drives to extinction about 25% of the species, although their estimates ranged from 15% to 40%. When asked about 5 °C (9.0 °F) warming, they believed it would threaten or drive into extinction 50% of the species, with the range between 32 and 70%.

A review of estimates from 82 studies, which have collectively projected the distribution of over 400,000 species, was published in 2024. The results suggested that between 13.9% and 27.6% of all species would be likely to go extinct by 2070 under the "moderate" emission scenario RCP4.5 and between 22.7 and 31.6% under the high-emission RCP8.5.

Also in 2024, a synthesis of 5 million projections from 485 studies was published. The results suggested that a warming of 1.5 °C (2.7 °F) would threaten the extinction of 1.8% of all species by 2100, while stopping the warming at 2024's level of 1.3 °C (2.3 °F) would still cause extinctions of 1.6% over the same timeframe. Then, greenhouse gas emissions remaining on the "current trajectory" of year 2024 would be consistent with extinctions of around 5% of species by the end of the century, while very high warming of 4.3 °C (7.7 °F) or 5.4 °C (9.7 °F) would likely result in extinctions of 15% and 30% of all species.

=== Fossil-based estimates ===
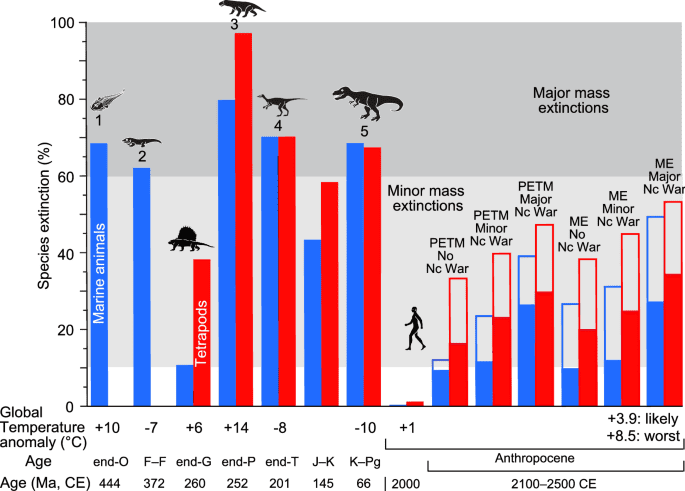
The comparison between great historical mass extinctions, current extent of extinctions, and the possible extent of future extinctions driven by a plausible scenario of climate change, with and without nuclear war; PETM: Paleocene–Eocene thermal maximum case; ME: mass extinction case

2021 research found that the "Big Five" mass extinctions were associated with a warming of around 5.2 °C (9.4 °F). The paper estimated that this level of warming over the preindustrial occurring today would also result in a mass extinction event of the same magnitude (~75% of marine animals wiped out). The following year, this was disputed by the Tohoku University Earth science scholar Kunio Kaiho. Based on his reanalysis of sedimentary rock record, he estimated that the loss of over 60% of marine species and over 35% of marine genera was correlated to a >7 °C (13 °F) global cooling and a 7–9 °C (13–16 °F) global warming, while for the terrestrial tetrapods, the same losses would be seen under ~7 °C (13 °F) of global cooling or warming.

Kaiho's follow-up paper estimated that under what he considered the most likely scenario of climate change, with 3 °C (5.4 °F) of warming by 2100 and 3.8 °C (6.8 °F) by 2500 (based on the average of Representative Concentration Pathways 4.5 and 6.0), would result in 8% marine species extinctions, 16–20% terrestrial animal species extinctions, and a combined average of 12–14% animal species extinctions. This was defined by the paper as a minor mass extinction, comparable to the end-Guadalupian and Jurassic–Cretaceous boundary events. It also cautioned that warming needed to be kept below 2.5 °C (4.5 °F) to prevent an extinction of >10% of animal species. Finally, it estimated that a minor nuclear war (defined as a nuclear exchange between India and Pakistan or an event of equivalent magnitude) would cause extinctions of 10–20% of species on its own, while a major nuclear war (defined as a nuclear exchange between United States and Russia) would cause the extinctions of 40-50% species.

== Worldwide extinction risk estimates for specific categories ==
=== Vertebrates ===
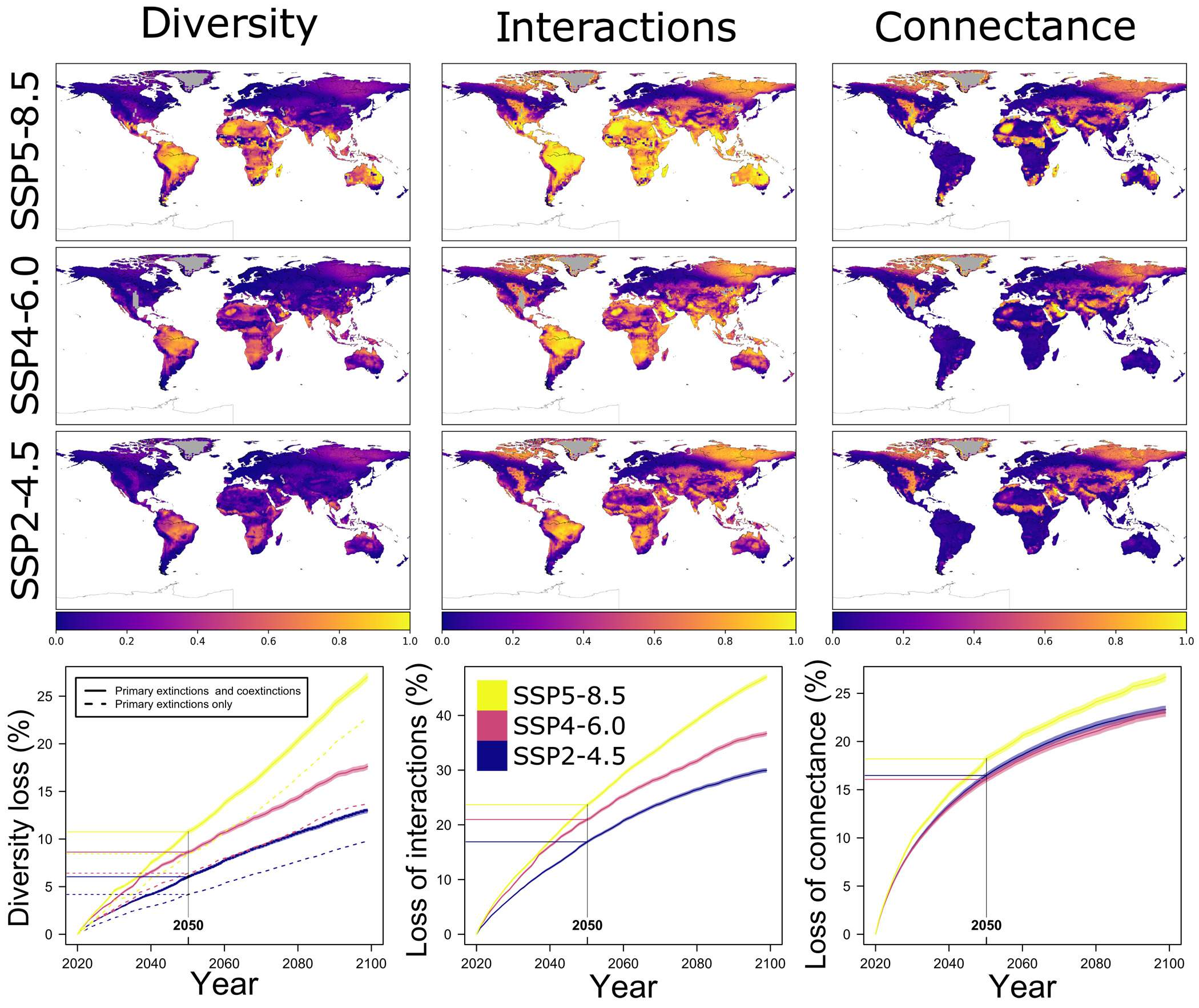
The impact of three different climate change scenarios on local biodiversity and risk of extinction of vertebrate species

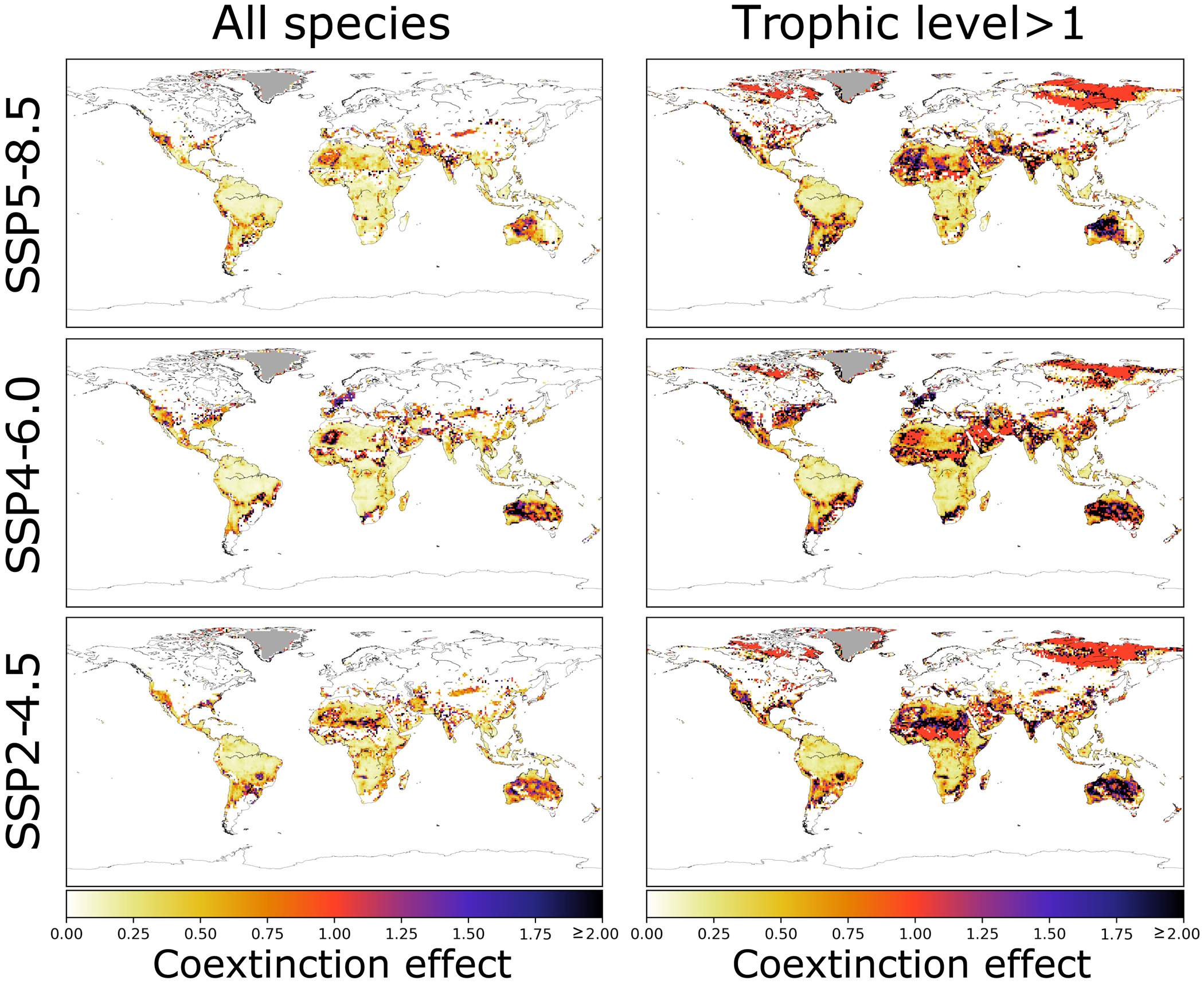
The added impact of vertebrate species coextinctions under three Shared Socioeconomic Pathways

A 2018 Science Magazine paper estimated that at 1.5 °C (2.7 °F), 2 °C (3.6 °F) and 3.2 °C (5.8 °F), over half of climatically determined geographic range would be lost by 4%, 8% and 26% of vertebrate species. This estimate was later directly cited in the IPCC Sixth Assessment Report. According to the IUCN Red List criteria, such a range loss is sufficient to classify as species as "endangered", and it is considered equivalent to >20% likelihood of extinction over the 10–100 years.

In 2022, a Science Advances paper estimated that local extinctions of 6% of vertebrates alone would occur by 2050 under the "intermediate" SSP2-4.5 scenario, and 10.8% under the pathway of continually increasing emissions SSP5-8.5. By 2100, those would increase to ~13% and ~27%, respectively. These estimates included local extinctions from all causes, not just climate change: however, it was estimated to account for the majority (~62%) of extinctions, followed by secondary extinctions or coextinctions (~20%), with land use change and invasive species combined accounting for less than 20%.

In 2023, a study estimated the proportion of vertebrates which would be exposed to extreme heat beyond what they were known to have experienced historically in at least half their distribution by the end of the century. Under the highest-emission pathway SSP5–8.5 (a warming of 4.4 °C (7.9 °F) by 2100, according to the paper), this would include ~41% of all land vertebrates (31.1% mammals, 25.8% birds, 55.5% amphibians and 51% reptiles). On the other hand, SSP1–2.6 (1.8 °C (3.2 °F) by 2100) would only see 6.1% of vertebrate species exposed to unprecedented heat in at least of their area, while SSP2–4.5 (2.7 °C (4.9 °F) by 2100) and SSP3–7.0 (3.6 °C (6.5 °F) by 2100) would see 15.1% and 28.8%, respectively.

Another 2023 paper suggested that under SSP5-8.5, around 55.3% of terrestrial vertebrate species would experience some local habitat loss by 2100 due to unprecedented aridity alone, while 16.7% would lose over half of their original habitat to aridity. Around 7.18% of those species will find all of their original habitat too dry to survive in by 2100, presumably going extinct unless migration or some form of adaptation to a dryer environment can occur. Under SSP2-4.5, 41.22% of the terrestrial vertebrates will lose some habitat to aridity, 8.6% will lose over half, and 4.7% will lose all of it, and under SSP1-2.6, these figures go down to 25.2%, 4.6% and 3%, respectively.

In 2024, a major review paper projected likely extinctions of 19% to 34% vertebrate species by the year 2070 under RCP4.5 and 36% to 44% under RCP8.5.

==== Amphibians ====
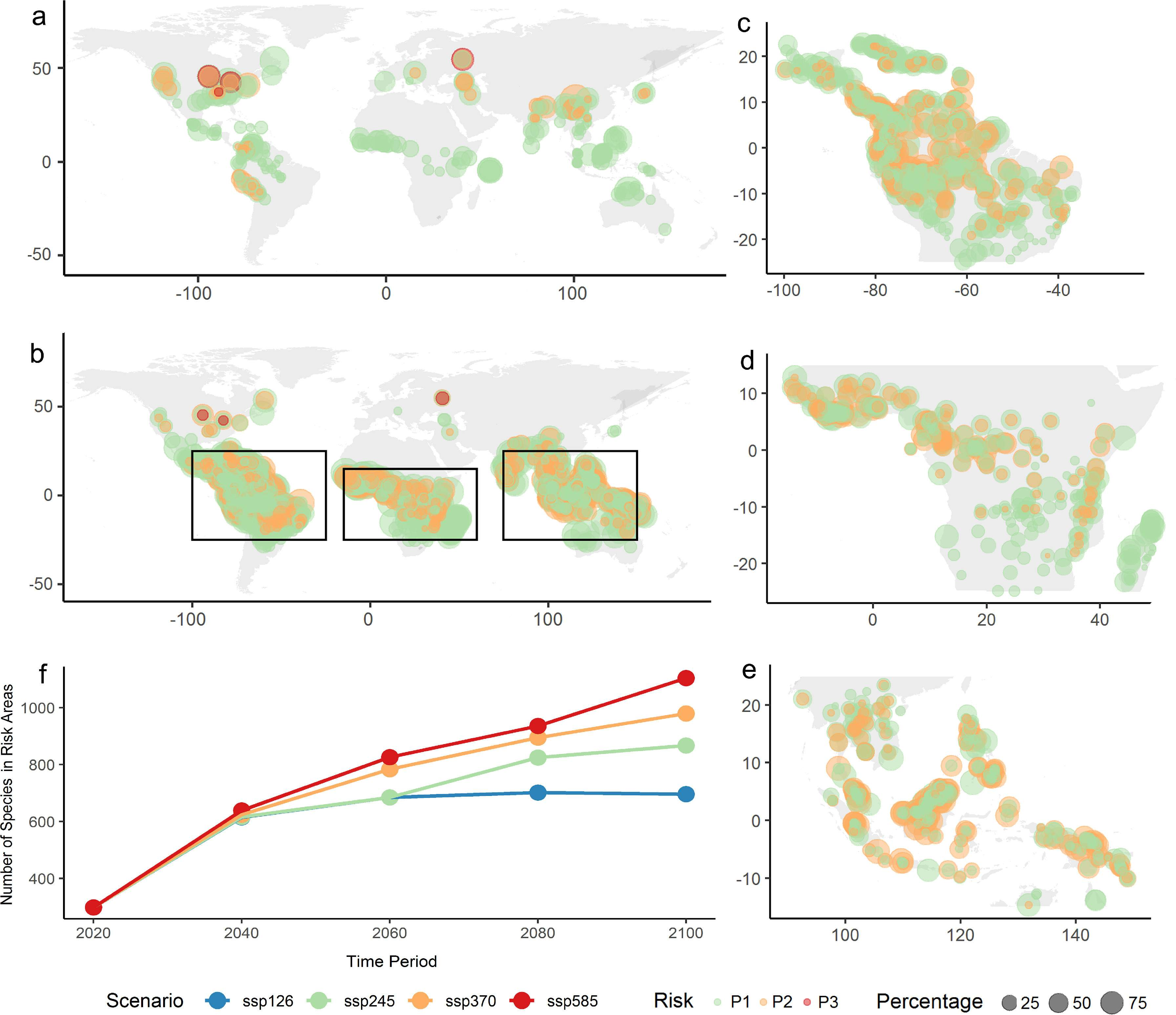
Present and future exposure of frog species around the world to unprecedented heat, under a more intense climate change scenario SSP3-7.0. Green, yellow and red circles show whether one, two or all three key thresholds (annual mean temperature, coldest month temperature or temperature variability) are exceeded by 2100.

A 2013 study estimated that 670–933 amphibian species (11–15%) are both highly vulnerable to climate change while already being on the IUCN Red List of threatened species. A further 698–1,807 (11–29%) amphibian species are not currently threatened, but could become threatened in the future due to their high vulnerability to climate change.

The IPCC Sixth Assessment Report concluded that while at 2 °C (3.6 °F), fewer than 3% of most amphibian species would be at a very high risk of extinction, salamanders are more than twice as vulnerable, with nearly 7% of species highly threatened. At 3.2 °C (5.8 °F), 11% of amphibians and 24% of salamanders would be at a very high risk of extinction.

A 2023 paper concluded that under the high-warming SSP5–8.5 scenario, 64.2% of amphibians would lose at least some habitat by 2100 purely due to an increase in aridity, with 33.3% losing over half of it, and 16.2% finding their entire current habitat too dry for them to survive in. These figures go down to 47.5%, 18.6% and 10.3% under the "intermediate" SSP2-4.5 scenario and to 31.7%, 11.2% and 7.4% under the high-mitigation SSP1-2.6.

A 2022 study estimated that while right now, 14.8% of the global range of all anurans (frogs) is in an extinction risk area, this will increase to 30.7% by 2100 under Shared Socioeconomic Pathway SSP1-2.6 (low emission pathway), 49.9% under SSP2-4.5, 59.4% under SSP3-7.0 and 64.4% under the highest-emitting SSP5-8.5. Extreme-sized anuran species are disproportionately affected: while currently only 0.3% of these species have >70% of their range in a risk area, this number will increase to 3.9% under SSP1-2.6, 14.2% under SSP2-4.5, 21.5% under SSP3-7 and 26% under SSP5-8.5

==== Birds ====
In 2012, it was estimated that on average, every degree of warming results in between 100 and 500 land bird extinctions. For a warming of 3.5 °C (6.3 °F) by 2100, the same research estimated between 600 and 900 land bird extinctions, with 89% occurring in the tropical environments. A 2013 study estimated that 608–851 bird species (6–9%) are highly vulnerable to climate change while being on the IUCN Red List of threatened species, and 1,715–4,039 (17–41%) bird species are not currently threatened but could become threatened due to climate change in the future.

A 2023 paper concluded that under the high-warming SSP5–8.5 scenario, 51.8% of birds would lose at least some habitat by 2100 as the conditions become more arid, but only 5.3% would lose over half of their habitat due to an increase in dryness alone, while 1.3% could be expected to lose their entire habitat. These figures go down to 38.7%, 2% and 1% under the "intermediate" SSP2-4.5 scenario and to 22.8%, 0.7% and 0.5% under the high-mitigation SSP1-2.6.

==== Fish and other marine species ====
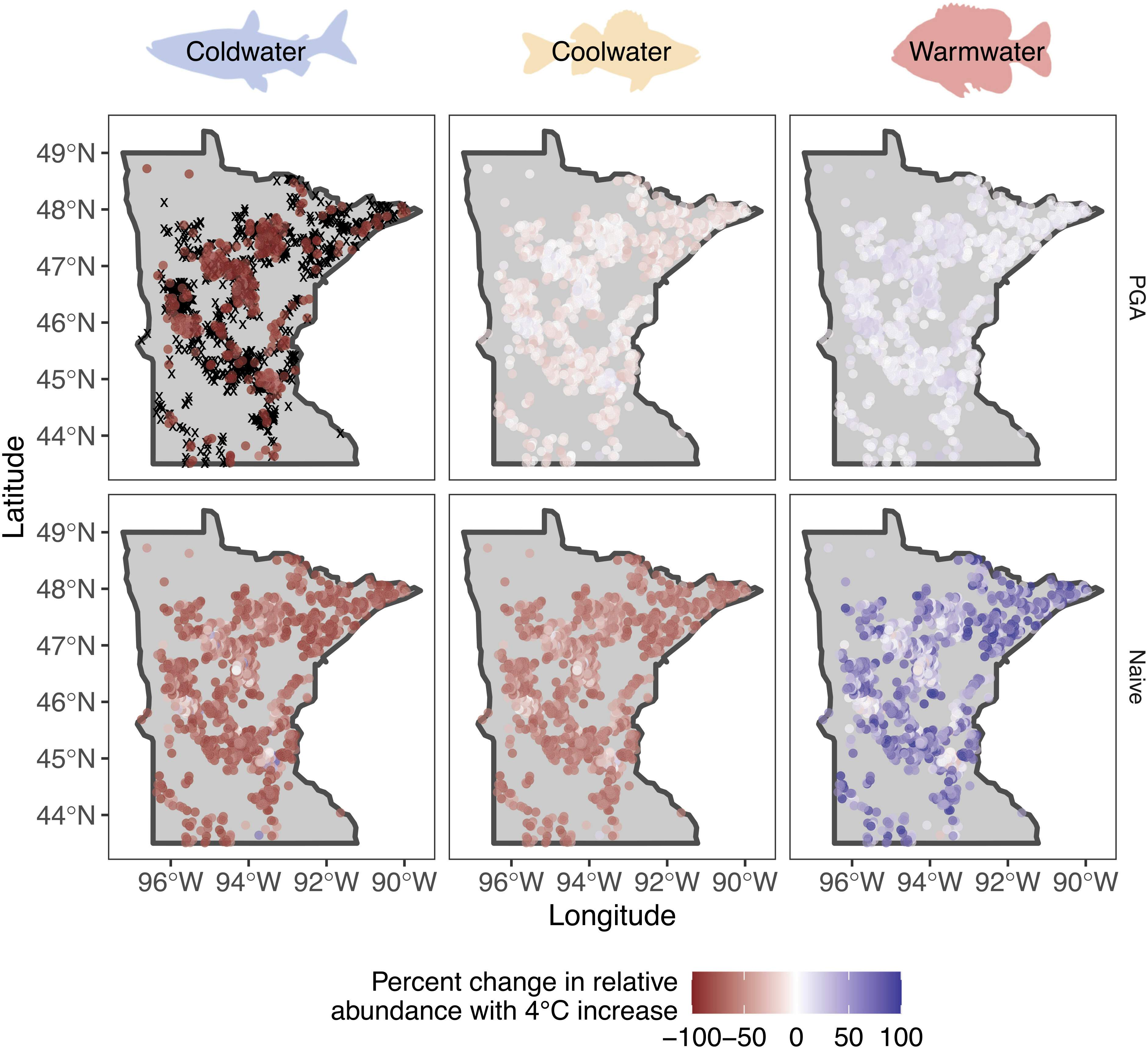
The projected changes in freshwater fish distribution in Minnesotan lakes under high future warming

A 2022 paper found that 45% of all marine species at risk of extinction are affected by climate change, but it is currently less damaging to their survival than overfishing, the aquarium trade, urban development and water pollution. However, if the emissions were to rise unchecked, then by the end of the century climate change would become as important as all of them combined. Continued high emissions until 2300 would then risk a mass extinction equivalent to Permian-Triassic extinction event, or "The Great Dying". On the other hand, staying at low emissions would reduce future climate-driven extinctions in the oceans by over 70%.

A 2021 study which analyzed around 11,500 freshwater fish species concluded that 1-4% of those species would be likely to lose over half of their current geographic range at 1.5 °C (2.7 °F) and 1-9% at 2 °C (3.6 °F). A warming of 3.2 °C (5.8 °F) would threaten 8-36% of freshwater fish species with such range loss and 4.5 °C (8.1 °F) would threaten 24-63%. The different percentages represent different assumptions about how well freshwater fishes could disperse to new areas and thus offset past range losses, with the highest percentages assuming no dispersal is possible. According to the IUCN Red List criteria, such a range loss is sufficient to classify as species as "endangered", and it is considered equivalent to >20% likelihood of extinction over the 10–100 years.

==== Mammals ====
A 2023 paper concluded that under the high-warming SSP5–8.5 scenario, 50.3% of mammals would lose at least some habitat by 2100 as the conditions become more arid. Out of those, 9.5% would lose over half of their habitat due to an increase in dryness alone, while 3.2% could be expected to lose their entire habitat ad the result. These figures go down to 38.27%, 4.96% and 2.22% under the "intermediate" SSP2-4.5 scenario, and to 22.65%, 2.03% and 1.15% under the high-mitigation SSP1-2.6.

==== Reptiles ====
A 2023 paper concluded that under the high-warming SSP5–8.5 scenario, 56.4% of reptiles would lose at least some habitat by 2100 as the conditions become more arid. Out of those, 24% would lose over half of their habitat due to an increase in dryness alone, while 10.94% could be expected to lose their entire habitat as the result. These figures go down to 41.7%, 12.5% and 7.2% under the "intermediate" SSP2-4.5 scenario, and to 24.6%, 6.6% and 4.4% under the high-mitigation SSP1-2.6.

In a 2010 study led by Barry Sinervo, researchers surveyed 200 sites in Mexico which showed 24 local extinctions (also known as extirpations), of Sceloporus lizards since 1975. Using a model developed from these observed extinctions the researchers surveyed other extinctions around the world and found that the model predicted those observed extirpations, thus attributing the extirpations around the world to climate warming. These models predict that extinctions of the lizard species around the world will reach 20% by 2080, but up to 40% extinctions in tropical ecosystems where the lizards are closer to their ecophysiological limits than lizards in the temperate zone.

=== Invertebrates ===
The IPCC Sixth Assessment Report estimates that while at 2 °C (3.6 °F), fewer than 3% of invertebrates would be at a very high risk of extinction, 15% would be at a very high risk at 3.2 °C (5.8 °F). This includes 12% of pollinator species.

==== Corals ====
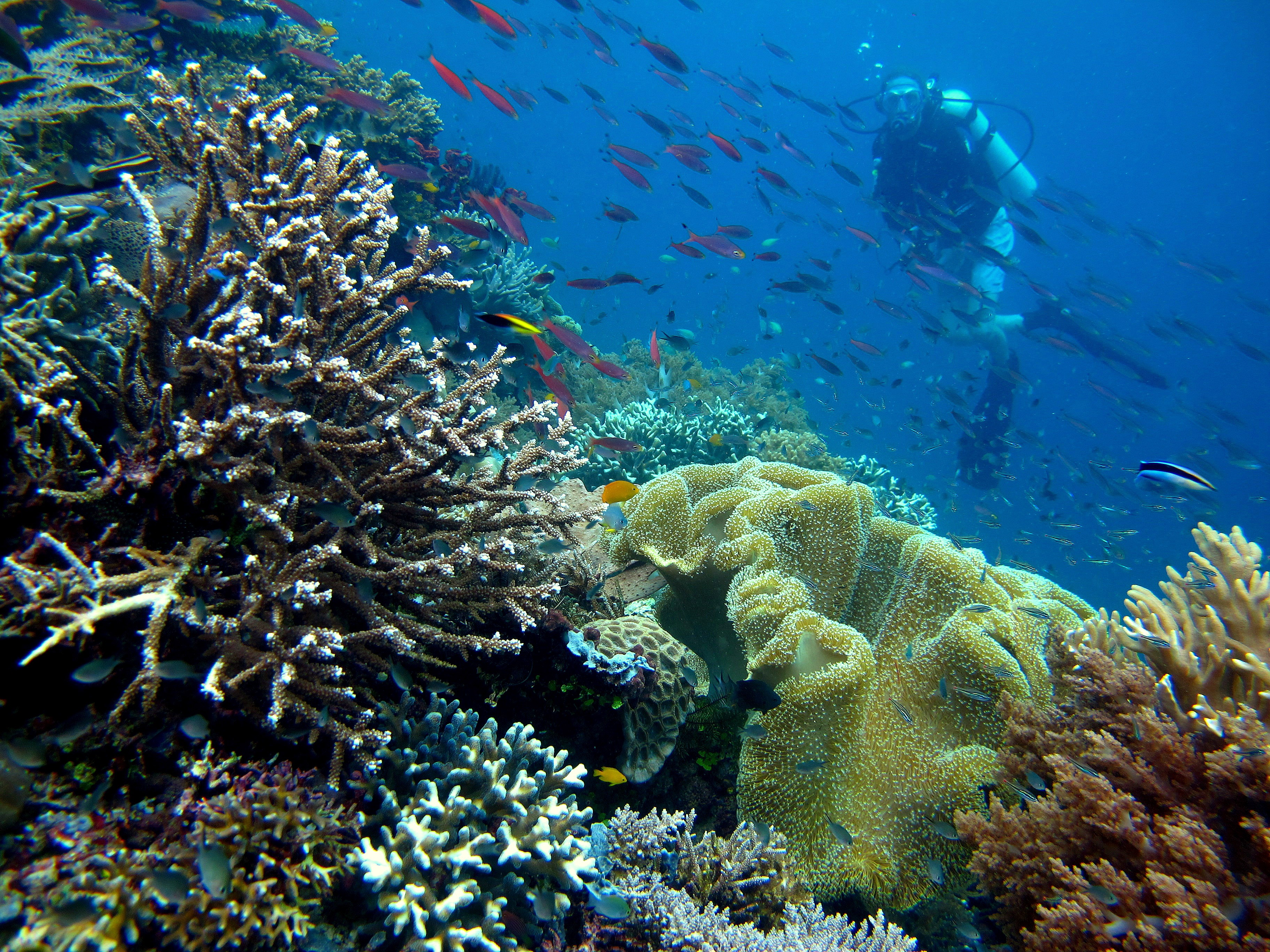
Coral reefs off Raja Ampat Islands in New Guinea

Almost no other ecosystem is as vulnerable to climate change as coral reefs. Updated 2022 estimates show that even at a global average increase of 1.5 °C (2.7 °F) over pre-industrial temperatures, only 0.2% of the world's coral reefs would still be able to withstand marine heatwaves, as opposed to 84% being able to do so now, with the figure dropping to 0% by 2 °C (3.6 °F) and beyond. However, it was found in 2021 that each square meter of coral reef area contains about 30 individual corals, and their total number is estimated at half a trillion - equivalent to all the trees in the Amazon, or all the birds in the world. As such, most individual coral reef species are predicted to avoid extinction even as coral reefs would cease to function as the ecosystems we know. A 2013 study found that 47–73 coral species (6–9%) are vulnerable to climate change while already threatened with extinction according to the IUCN Red List, and 74–174 (9–22%) coral species were not vulnerable to extinction at the time of publication, but could be threatened under continued climate change, making them a future conservation priority. The authors of the recent coral number estimates suggest that those older projections were too high, although this has been disputed.

==== Insects ====
Bumblebee collecting pollen

Insects account for the vast majority of invertebrate species. A 2018 Science Magazine paper estimated that at 1.5 °C (2.7 °F), 2 °C (3.6 °F) and 3.2 °C (5.8 °F), over half of climatically determined geographic range would be lost by 6%, 18% and ~49% of insect species, with this loss corresponding to >20% likelihood of extinction over the next 10–100 years according to the IUCN criteria.

A 2020 long-term study of more than 60 bee species published in the journal Science found that climate change causes drastic declines in the population and diversity of bumblebees across the two continents studied, independent of land use change and at rates "consistent with a mass extinction." When 1901-1974 "baseline" period was compared with the 2000 to 2014 recent period, then North America's bumblebee populations were found to have fallen by 46%, while Europe's population fell by 14%. The strongest effects were seen in the southern regions, where rapid increases in frequency of extreme warm years had exceeded the species' historical temperature ranges.

In 2024, a major review paper projected likely extinctions of 14% to 27% insects under RCP4.5 by the year 2070, and 23% to 31% under RCP8.5.

=== Plants and fungi ===
Data from 2018 found that at 1.5 °C (2.7 °F), 2 °C (3.6 °F) and 3.2 °C (5.8 °F) of global warming, over half of climatically determined geographic range would be lost by 8%, 16%, and 44% of plant species. This corresponds to more than 20% likelihood of extinction over the next 10–100 years under the IUCN criteria.

The 2022 IPCC Sixth Assessment Report estimates that while at 2 °C (3.6 °F) of global warming, fewer than 3% of flowering plants would be at a very high risk of extinction, this increases to 10% at 3.2 °C (5.8 °F).

A 2020 meta-analysis found that while 39% of vascular plant species were likely threatened with extinction, only 4.1% of this figure could be attributed to climate change, with land use change activities predominating. However, the researchers suggested that this may be more representative of the slower pace of research on effects of climate change on plants. For fungi, it estimated that 9.4% are threatened due to climate change, while 62% are threatened by other forms of habitat loss.

2024 review paper projected likely extinctions of 8% to 16% plant species as well as 8%–27% fungi species under RCP4.5 by 2070. Under RCP8.5 23% to 31% of both plant and fungi species would be lost.

== Predicted and observed extinctions in specific geographic areas ==
A 2018 study from the University of East Anglia team analyzed the impacts of 2 °C (3.6 °F) and 4.5 °C (8.1 °F) of warming on 80,000 plant and animal species in 35 of the world's biodiversity hotspots. It found that these areas could lose up to 25% and 50% of their species, respectively: they may or may not be able to survive outside of them.

=== Africa ===
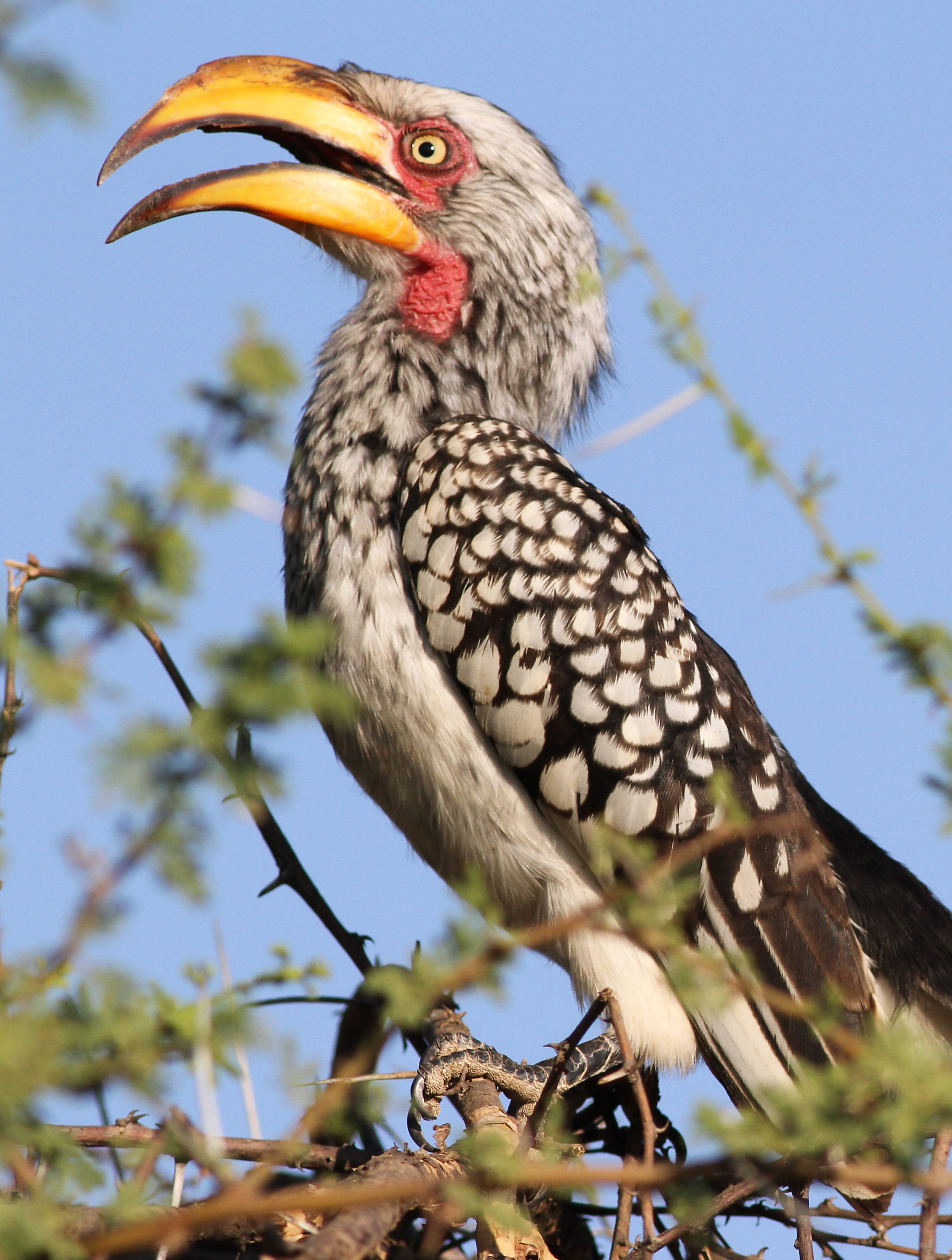
A Southern Yellow-billed Hornbill female

In 2019, it was estimated that the current great ape range in Africa will decline massively under both the severe RCP8.5 scenario and the more moderate RCP4.5. The apes could potentially disperse to new habitats, but those would lie almost completely outside of their current protected areas, meaning that conservation planning needs to be "urgently" updated to account for this.

In 2019, it was also estimated that multiple bird species endemic to southern Africa's Kalahari Desert (Southern Pied Babblers, Southern Yellow-billed Hornbills and Southern Fiscals) would either be all-but-lost from it or reduced to its eastern fringes by the end of the century, depending on the emission scenario. While the temperatures are not projected to become so high as to kill the birds outright, they would still be high enough to prevent them from sustaining sufficient body mass and energy for breeding. By 2022, breeding success of the Southern Yellow-billed Hornbills was already observed to collapse in the hottest, southern parts of the desert. It was predicted that those particular subpopulations would disappear by 2027. Similarly, it was found that two Ethiopian bird species, White-tailed Swallow and Ethiopian Bush-crow, would lose 68-84% and >90% of their range by 2070. As their existing geographical range is already very limited, this means that it would likely end up too small to support a viable population even under the scenario of limited climate change, rendering these species extinct in the wild.

According to 2018 research, Madagascar would lose 60% of its species under 4.5 °C (8.1 °F), while Fynbos in Western Cape region of South Africa would lose a third of its species. Miombo Woodlands of South Africa would lose around 90% of their amphibians and about 86% of their birds if the warming were to reach 4.5 °C (8.1 °F).

=== Asia-Pacific ===
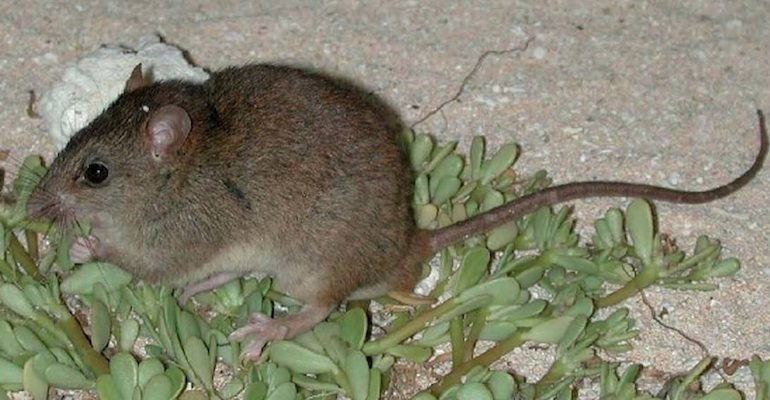
The Bramble Cay melomys, thought to be the first mammal species to go extinct due to the impacts of climate change

A 2013 paper looked at 12 900 islands in the Pacific Ocean and Southeast Asia which host over 3000 vertebrates, and how they would be affected by sea level rise of 1, 3 and 6 meters (with the last two levels not anticipated until after this century). Depending on the extent of sea level rise, 15–62% of islands studied would be completely underwater, and 19–24% will lose 50–99% of their area. This was correlated with the total habitat loss for 37 species under 1 meter of sea level rise, and for 118 species under 3 meters. A subsequent paper found that under RCP8.5, the scenario of continually increasing greenhouse gas emissions, numerous vulnerable and endangered vertebrate species living on the low-lying islands in the Pacific Ocean would be threatened by high waves at the end of the century, with the risk substantially reduced under the more moderate RCP4.5 scenario.

In 2008, the white lemuroid possum was reported to be the first known mammal species to be driven extinct by climate change. However, these reports were based on a misunderstanding. One population of these possums in the mountain forests of North Queensland is severely threatened by climate change as the animals cannot survive extended temperatures over 30 °C (86 °F). However, another population 100 kilometres south remains in good health. On the other hand, the Bramble Cay melomys, which lived on a Great Barrier Reef island, was reported as the first mammal to go extinct due to human-induced sea level rise, with the Australian government officially confirming its extinction in 2019. Another Australian species, the greater stick-nest rat (Leporillus conditor) may be next.

Following the 2019–20 Australian bushfire season, Kate's leaf tailed gecko lost over 80% of its available habitat. Similarly, a near-complete extirpation of Kangaroo Island dunnarts had occurred, as only one individual may have survived out of the population of 500. Those bushfires have also caused the loss of 8,000 koalas in New South Wales alone, further endangering the species.

According to 2018 research, southwestern Australia would lose around 90% of amphibians if the warming were to reach 4.5 °C (8.1 °F).

2022 research predicted that in Bangladesh, between 2% and 34% of the native butterfly species could lose their entire habitat under scenarios SSP1-2.6 and SSP5-8.5, respectively.

=== Europe ===
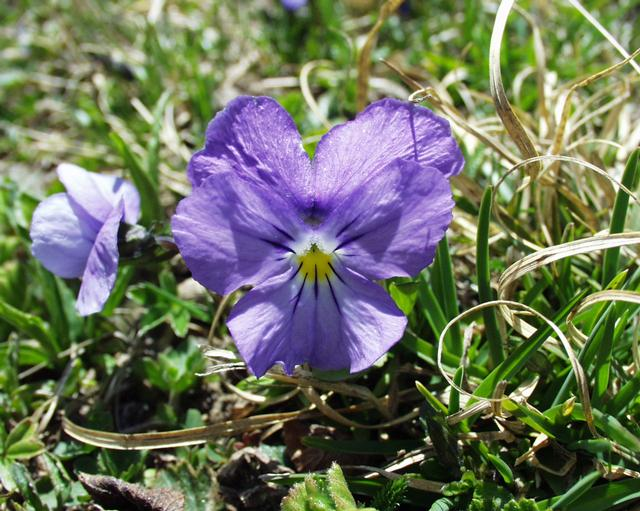
Viola Calcarata or mountain violet, which is projected to go extinct in the Swiss Alps around 2050

Alpine and mountain plant species are known to be some of the most vulnerable to climate change. In 2010, a study looking at 2,632 species located in and around European mountain ranges found that depending on the climate scenario, 36–55% of alpine species, 31–51% of subalpine species and 19–46% of montane species would lose more than 80% of their suitable habitat by 2070–2100. In 2012, it was estimated that for the 150 plant species in the European Alps, their range would, on average, decline by 44%-50% by the end of the century - moreover, lags in their shifts would mean that around 40% of their remaining range would soon become unsuitable as well, often leading to an extinction debt. In 2022, it was found that those earlier studies simulated abrupt, "stepwise" climate shifts, while more realistic gradual warming would see a rebound in alpine plant diversity after mid-century under the "intermediate" and most intense global warming scenarios RCP4.5 and RCP8.5. However, for RCP8.5, that rebound would be deceptive, followed by the same collapse in biodiversity at the end of the century as simulated in the earlier papers. This is because on average, every degree of warming reduces total species population growth by 7%, and the rebound was driven by colonization of niches left behind by most vulnerable species like Androsace chamaejasme and Viola calcarata going extinct by mid-century or earlier.

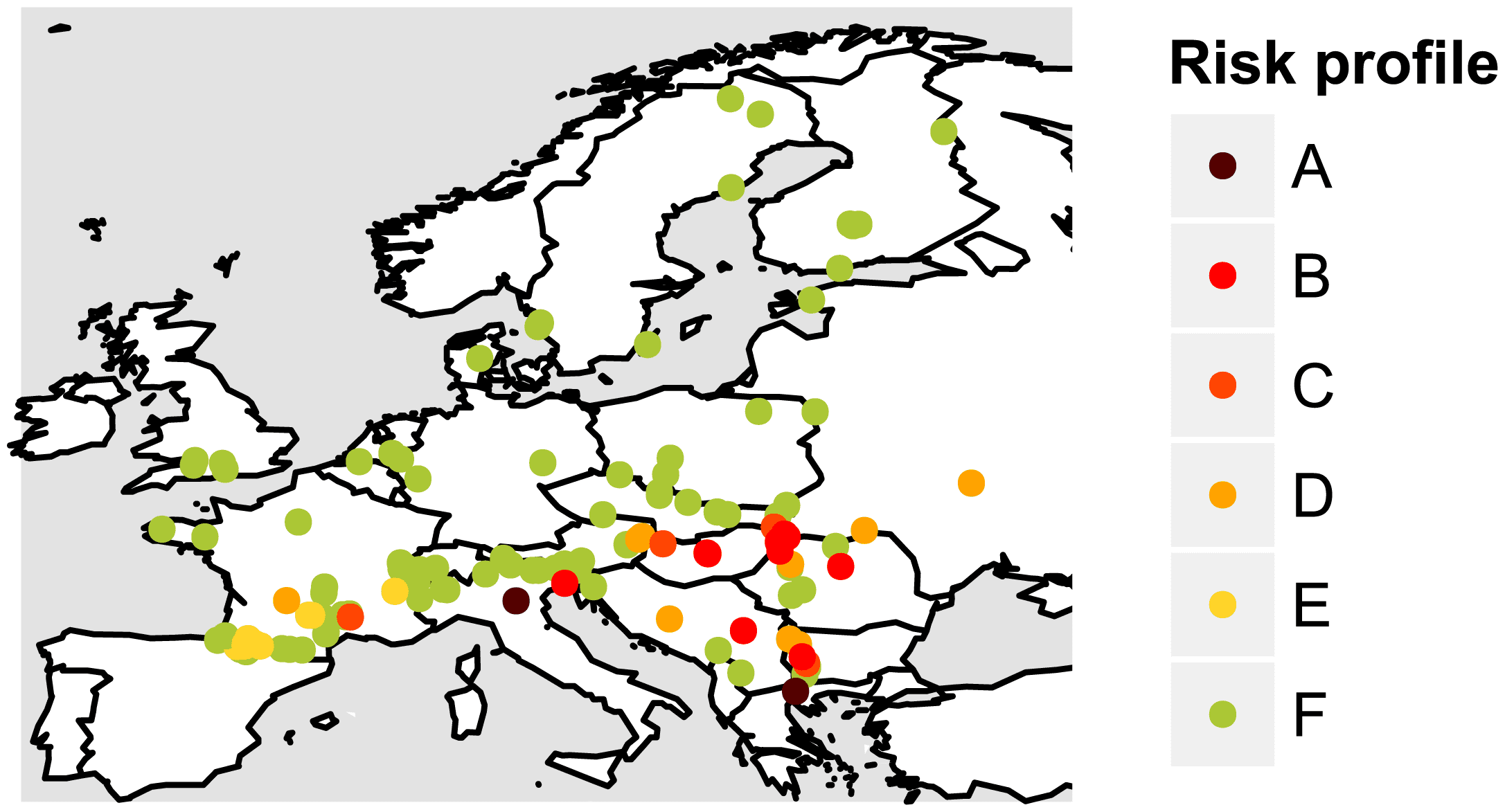
The vulnerability of different European lizard populations to extinctions caused by climate change. Populations in group A are already at risk; B and C will be threatened under 2 °C (3.6 °F). Groups D and E will become threatened under 3 °C (5.4 °F) and 4 °C (7.2 °F), and Group F is unlikely to be threatened.

A 2015 study looked at the persistence of common lizard populations in Europe under future climate change. It found that under 2 °C (3.6 °F), 11% of the lizard population would be threatened with local extinction around 2050 and 14% by 2100. At 3 °C (5.4 °F) by 2100, 21% of the population are threatened, and at 4 °C (7.2 °F), 30% of the populations are.

A 2018 estimate suggests that two prominent species of seagrasses in the Mediterranean Sea would be substantially affected under the worst-case greenhouse gas emission scenario, with Posidonia oceanica losing 75% of its habitat by 2050 and potentially becoming functionally extinct by 2100, while Cymodocea nodosa would lose ~46% of its habitat and then stabilize due to expansion into previously unsuitable areas.

A 2018 study examined the impact of climate change on Troglohyphantes cave spiders in the Alps and found that even the low-emission scenario RCP2.6 would reduce their habitat by ~45% by 2050, while the high emission scenario would reduce it by ~55% by 2050 and ~70% by 2070. The authors suggested that this may be sufficient to drive the most restricted species to extinction.

In 2022, it was found that the warming which occurred over the past 40 years in Germany's Bavaria region pushed out cold-adapted grasshoppers, butterfly and dragonfly species, while allowing warm-adapted species from those taxa to become more widespread. Altogether, 27% of dragonfly and 41% of butterfly and grasshopper species occupied less area, while 52% of dragonflies became more widespread, along with 27% of grasshoppers (41%, 20 species) and 20% of butterflies, with the rest showing no trend in area change. The study only measured geographic spread and not total abundance. While the paper looked at both climate and land use change, it suggested the latter was only a significant negative factor for specialist butterfly species.

=== Central and South America ===
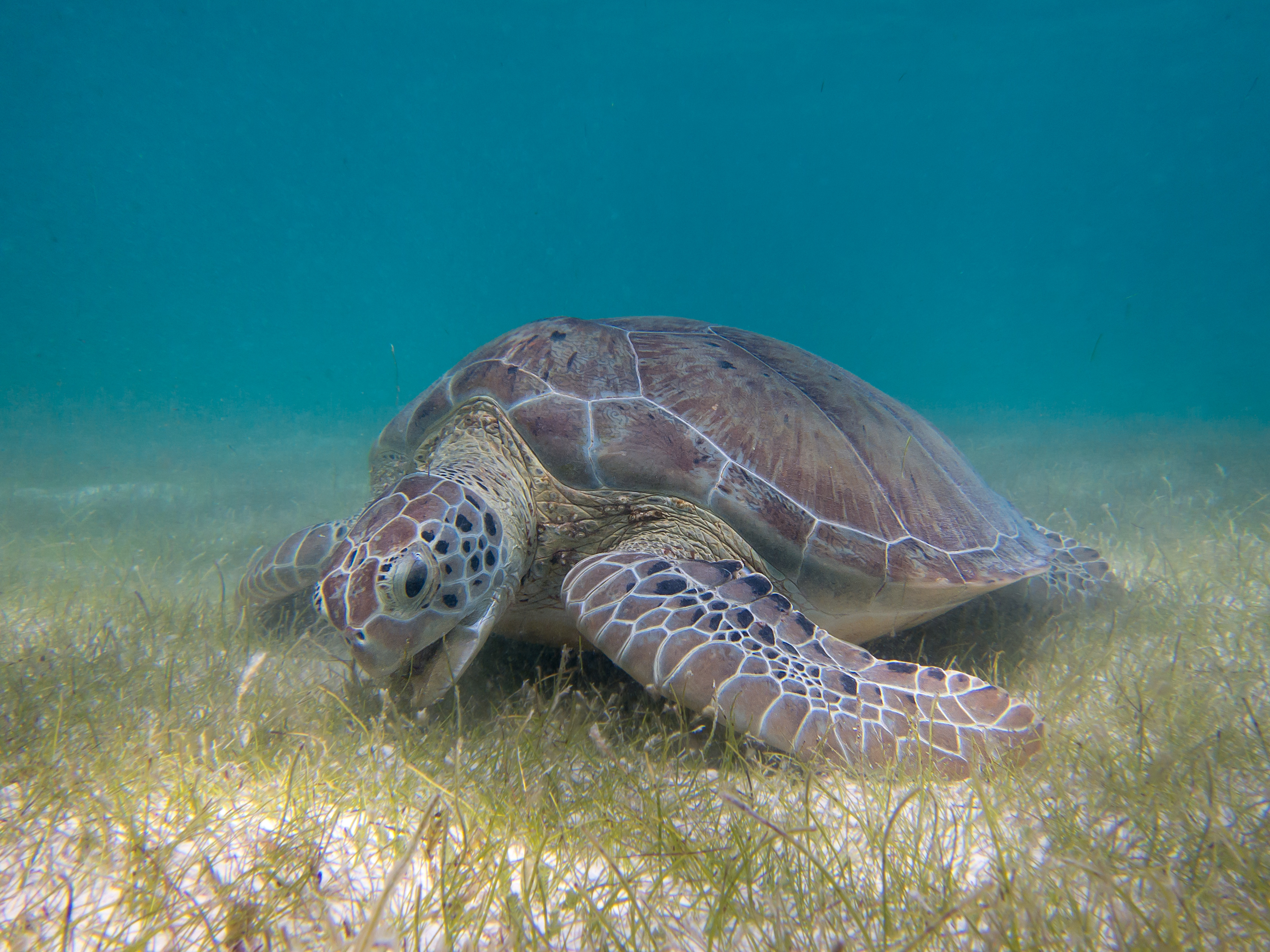
Green sea turtle grazing grass

2016 research found that sex ratios for sea turtles in the Caribbean are being affected because of climate change. Environmental data were collected from the annual rainfall and tide temperatures over the course of 200 years and showed an increase in air temperature (mean of 31.0 degree Celsius). These data were used to relate the decline of the sex ratios of sea turtles in the North East Caribbean and climate change. The species of sea turtles include Dermochelys coriacea, Chelonia myads, and Eretmochelys imbricata. Extinction is a risk for these species as the sex ratio is being afflicted causing a higher female to male ratio. Projections estimate the declining rate of male Chelonia myads as 2.4% hatchlings being male by 2030 and 0.4% by 2090.

It has been estimated that by 2050, climate change alone could reduce species richness of trees in the Amazon rainforest by 31–37%, while deforestation alone could be responsible for 19–36%, and the combined effect might reach 58%. The paper's worst-case scenario for both stressors had only 53% of the original rainforest area surviving as a continuous ecosystem by 2050, with the rest reduced to a severely fragmented block. Another study estimated that the rainforest would lose 69% of its plant species under the warming of 4.5 °C (8.1 °F).

=== North America ===
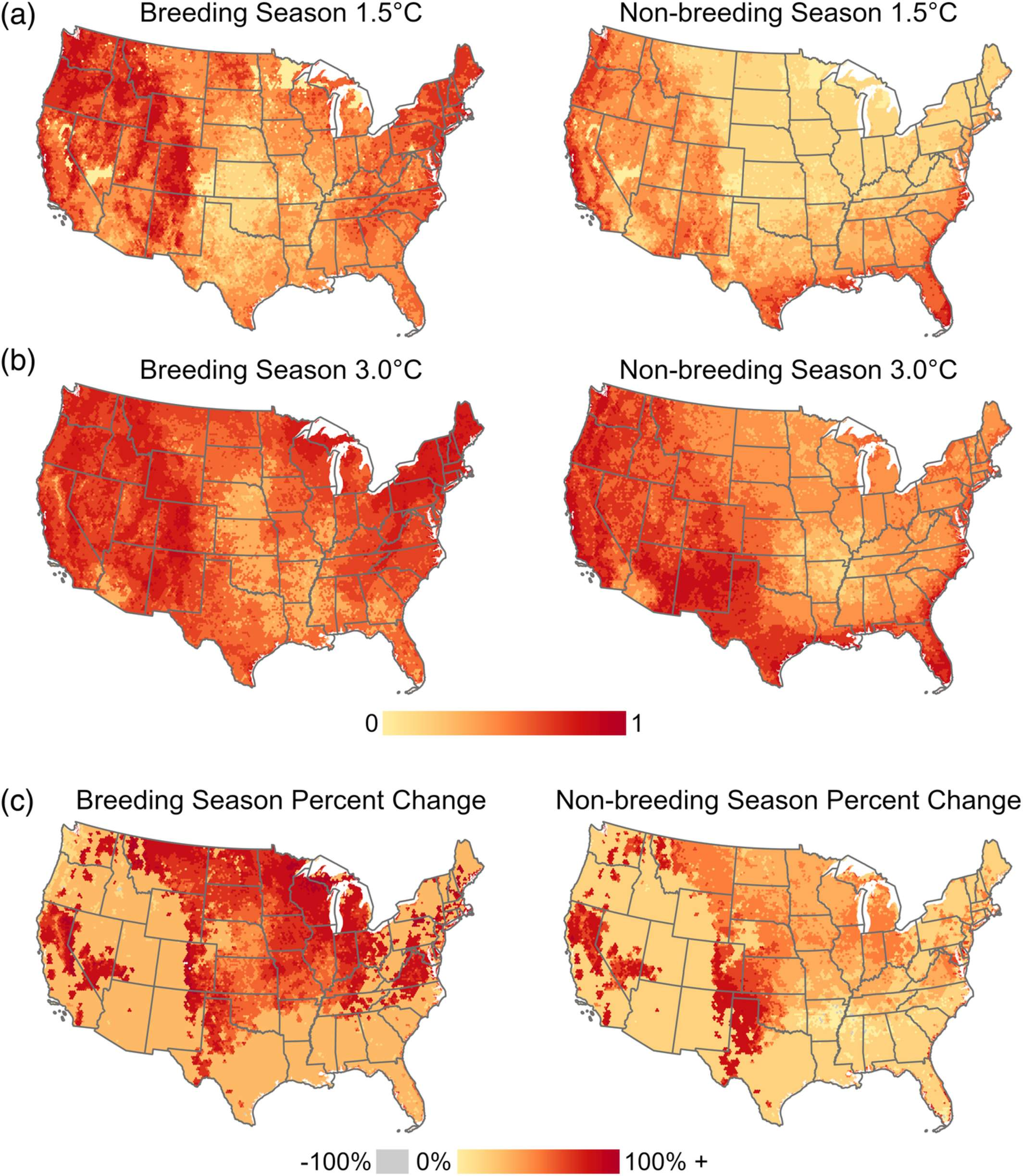
Increase in extinction risk for US bird species under two different levels of warming

One of the earliest studies to link insect extinctions to recent climate change was published in 2002, when observations of two populations of Bay checkerspot butterfly found that they were threatened by changes in precipitation.

In 2015, it was projected that native forest birds in Hawaii would be threatened with extinction due to the spread of avian malaria under the high-warming RCP8.5 scenario or a similar scenario from earlier modelling, but would persist under the "intermediate" RCP4.5.

A 2017 analysis found that the mountain goat populations of coastal Alaska would go extinct sometime between 2015 and 2085 in half of the considered scenarios of climate change. Another analysis found that the Miombo Woodlands of South Africa are predicted to lose about 80% of their mammal species if the warming reached 4.5 °C (8.1 °F).

For the 604 bird species in mainland North America, 2020 research concluded that under 1.5 °C (2.7 °F) warming, 207 would be moderately vulnerable to extinction and 47 would be highly vulnerable. At 2 °C (3.6 °F), this changes to 198 moderately vulnerable and 91 highly vulnerable. At 3 °C (5.4 °F), there are more highly vulnerable species (205) than moderately vulnerable species (140). Relative to 3 °C (5.4 °F), stabilizing the warming at 1.5 °C (2.7 °F) represents a reduction in extinction risk for 76% of those species, and 38% stop being vulnerable.

In 2023, a study looked at freshwater fish in 900 lakes of the American state of Minnesota. It found that if their water temperature increases by 4 °C (7.2 °F) in July (said to occur under approximately the same amount of global warming), then cold-water fish species like cisco would disappear from 167 lakes, which represents 61% of their habitat in Minnesota. Cool-water yellow perch would see its numbers decline by about 7% across all of Minnesota's lakes, while warm-water bluegill would increase by around 10%.

=== Polar regions ===
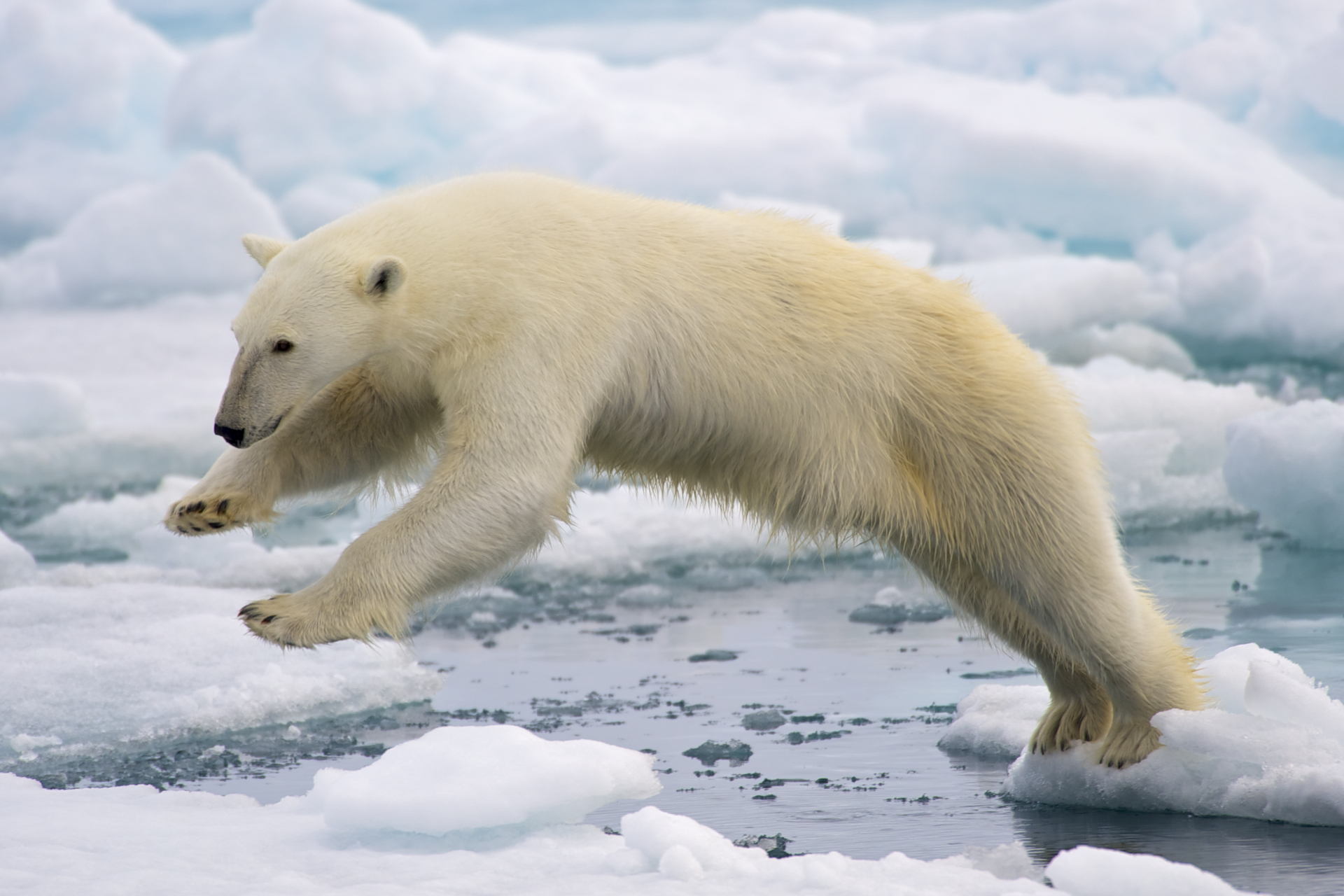
A polar bear

It has been projected in 2015 that many fish species will migrate towards the North and South poles as a result of climate change. Under the highest emission scenario RCP8.5, 2 new species would enter (invade) per 0.5° of latitude in the Arctic Ocean and 1.5 in the Southern Ocean. It would also result in an average of 6.5 local extinctions per 0.5° of latitude outside of the poles.

In 2020, a study in Nature Climate Change estimated the effects of Arctic sea ice decline on polar bear populations (which rely on the sea ice to hunt seals) under two climate change scenarios. Under high greenhouse gas emissions, at most a few high-Arctic populations will remain by 2100: under more moderate scenario, the species will survive this century, but several major subpopulations will still be wiped out.

Climate change is particularly threatening to penguins. As early as in 2008, it was estimated that every time Southern Ocean temperatures increase by 0.26 °C (0.47 °F), this reduces king penguin populations by 9%. Under the worst-case warming trajectory, king penguins will permanently lose at least two out of their current eight breeding sites, and 70% of the species (1.1 million pairs) will have to relocate to avoid disappearance. Emperor penguin populations may be at a similar risk, with 80% of populations being at risk of extinction by 2100 with no mitigation. With Paris Agreement temperature goals in place, however, that number may decline to 31% under the 2 °C (3.6 °F) goal or 19% under the 1.5 °C (2.7 °F) goal.

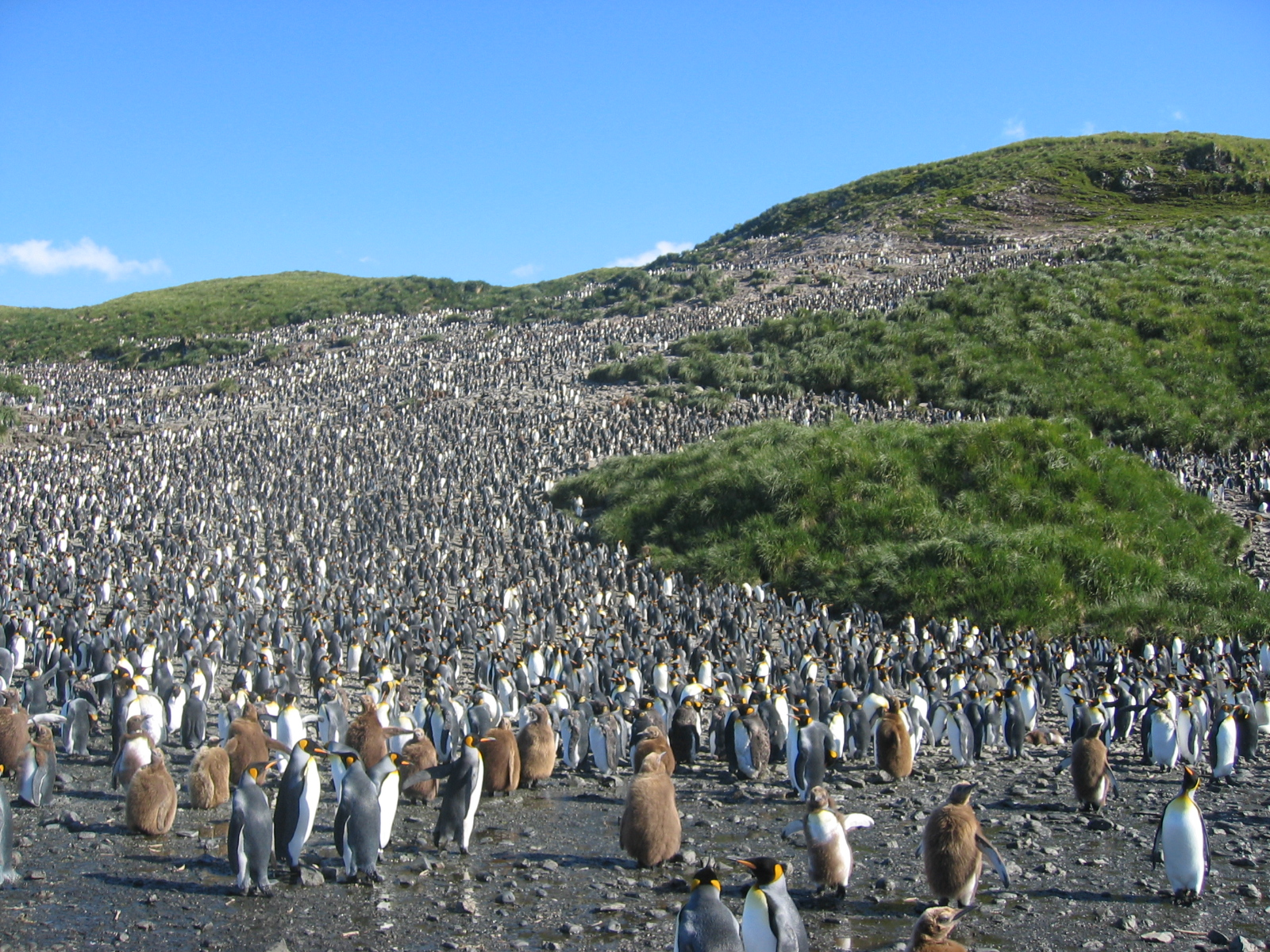
King penguins are threatened by climate change in Antarctica.

A 27-year study of the largest colony of Magellanic penguins in the world, published in 2014, found that extreme weather caused by climate change kills 7% of penguin chicks in an average year, accounting for up to 50% of all chick deaths in some years. Since 1987, the number of breeding pairs in the colony has reduced by 24%. Chinstrap penguins are also known to be in decline, mainly due to corresponding declines of Antarctic krill. And it was estimated that while Adélie penguins will retain some of its habitat past 2099, one-third of colonies along the West Antarctic Peninsula (WAP) will be in decline by 2060. Those colonies are believed to represent about 20% of the entire species.

== Impacts of species degradation on livelihoods ==
The livelihoods of nature dependent communities depend on abundance and availability of certain species. Climate change conditions such as increase in atmospheric temperature and carbon dioxide concentration directly affect availability of biomass energy, food, fiber and other ecosystem services. Degradation of species supplying such products directly affect the livelihoods of people relying on them more so in Africa. The situation is likely to be exacerbated by changes in rainfall variability which is likely to give dominance to invasive species especially those that are spread across large latitudinal gradients. The effects that climate change has on both plant and animal species within certain ecosystems has the ability to directly affect the human inhabitants who rely on natural resources. Frequently, the extinction of plant and animal species create a cyclic relationship of species endangerment in ecosystems which are directly affected by climate change.

=== Species adaptation ===
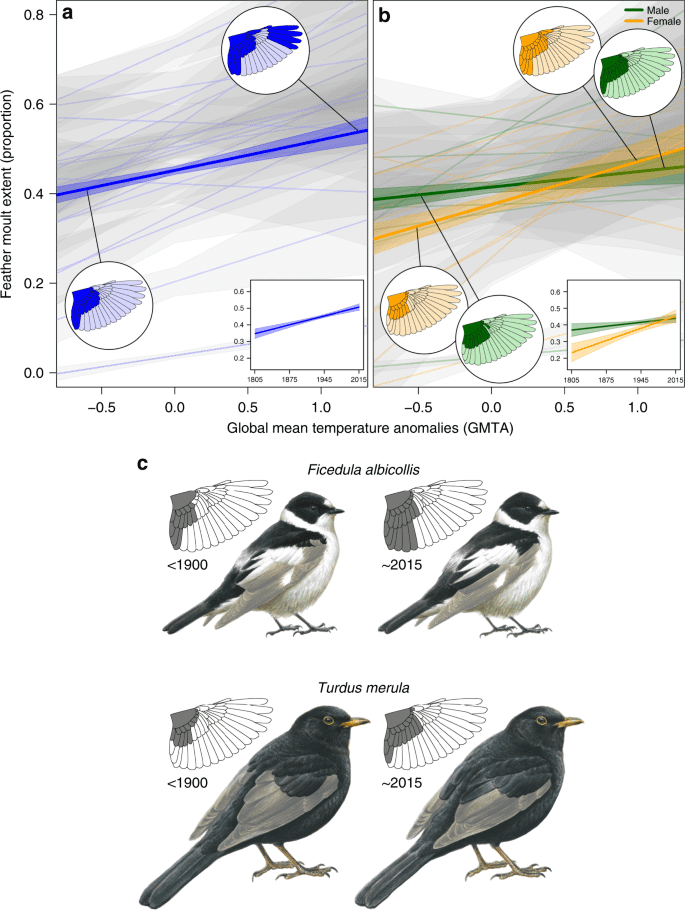
Museum specimens of Collared flycatcher (top) and Eurasian blackbird (bottom) juveniles compared with modern-day birds. Nesting feathers are replaced with adult plumage earlier, and females now complete the shift earlier than males, while in the past it was the opposite.

Many species are already responding to climate change by moving into different areas. For instance, Antarctic hair grass is colonizing areas of Antarctica where previously their survival range was limited. Similarly, 5-20% of the United States land area is likely to end up with a different biome at the end of the century, as vegetation undergoes range shifts. However, such shifts can only go so far to protect species: globally, only 5% of ectotherm species' present locations are within 50 km of a location which would remain fully suitable and not impose evolutionary fitness costs on them by 2100, even under "mid-range" warming scenarios. Completely random dispersal may have an 87% chance of sending the species to a less suitable location. Species in the tropics have the least extensive dispersal options, while species in the temperate mountains face the greatest risks of moving to a wrong location. Similarly, an artificial selection experiment demonstrated that evolution of tolerance to warming can occur in fish, but the rate of evolution appears limited to 0.04 °C (0.072 °F) per generation, which is too slow to protect the vulnerable species from impacts of climate change.

Rising temperatures are beginning to have a noticeable impact on birds, and butterflies nearly 160 species from 10 different zones have shifted their ranges northward by 200 km in Europe and North America. The migration range of larger animals has been substantially constrained by human development. In Britain, spring butterflies are appearing an average of 6 days earlier than two decades ago.

Birds are a group of warm-blooded vertebrates constituting the class Aves, characterized by feathers, toothless beaked jaws, the laying of hard-shelled eggs, a high metabolic rate, a four-chambered heart, and a strong yet lightweight skeleton.

Climate change has already altered the appearance of some birds by facilitating changes to their feathers. A comparison of museum specimens of juvenile passerines from 1800s with juveniles of the same species today had shown that these birds now complete the switch from their nesting feathers to adult feathers earlier in their lifecycle, and that females now do this earlier than males. Further, blue tits are defined by blue and yellow feathers, but a study in Mediterranean France had shown that those contrasting colors became less bright and intense in just the period between 2005 and 2019.

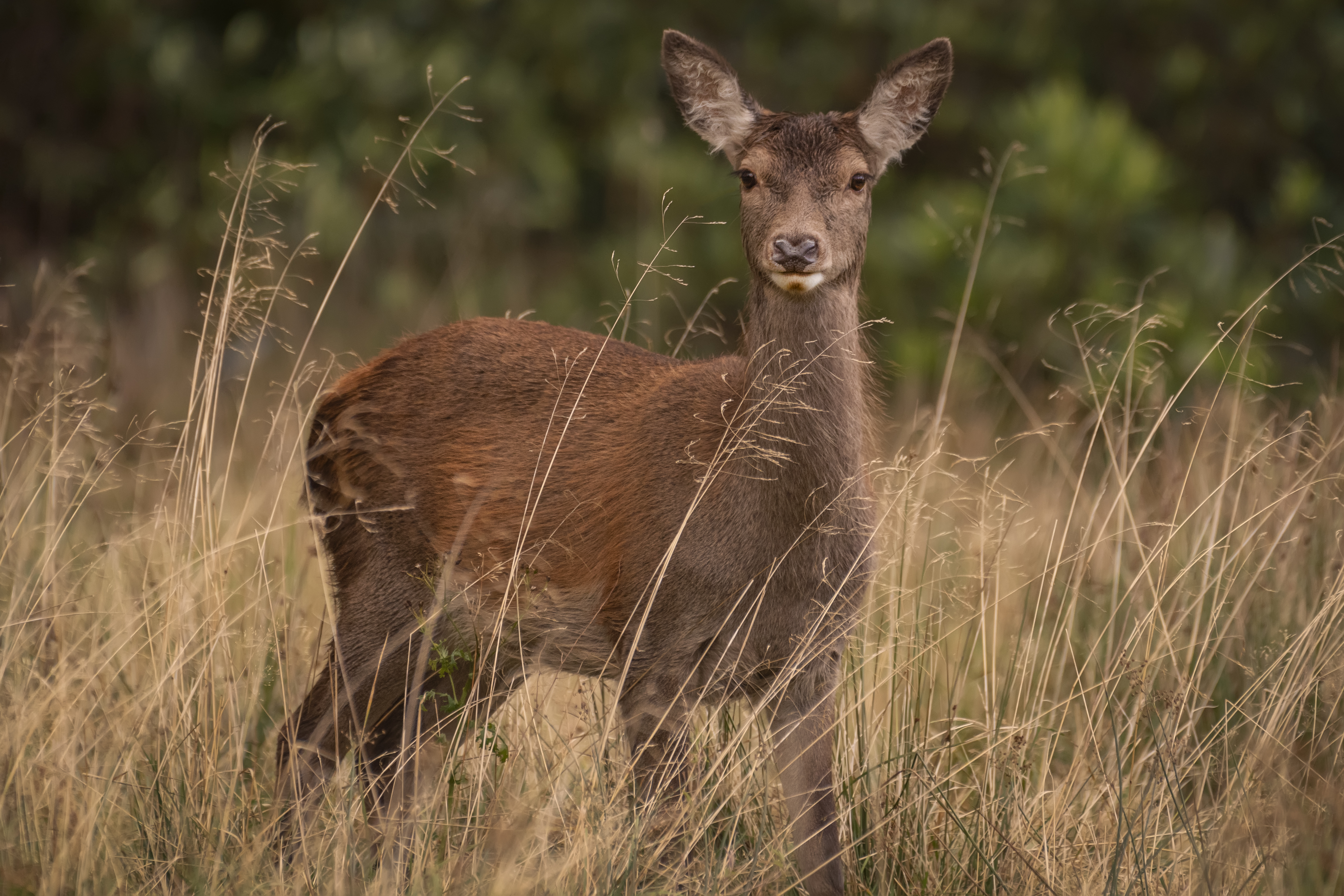
A young red deer in the wild in Scotland

Climate change has affected the gene pool of the red deer population on Rùm, one of the Inner Hebrides islands, Scotland. Warmer temperatures resulted in deer giving birth on average three days earlier for each decade of the study. The gene which selects for earlier birth has increased in the population because those with the gene have more calves over their lifetime.

== Prevention ==
In addition to reducing future warming to the lowest possible levels, preserving the current and likely near-future habitat of endangered species in protected areas in efforts like 30x30 is a crucial aspect of helping species survive. A more radical approach is the assisted migration of species endangered by climate change to new habitats, whether passively (through measures like the creation of wildlife corridors to allow them to move to a new area unimpeded), or their active transport to new areas. This is approach is more controversial, since some of the rescued species may end up invasive in their new locations. I.e. while it would be relatively easy to move polar bears, which are currently threatened by Arctic sea ice decline, to Antarctica, the damage to Antarctica's ecosystem is considered too great to allow this. Finally, species which are extinct in the wild may be kept alive in artificial surroundings until a suitable natural habitat may be restored. In cases where captive breeding fails, embryo cryopreservation has been proposed as an option of last resort.

=== Apiculture initiatives to prevent human-wildlife conflict in Zimbabwe ===
Women in rural communities in Hurungwe rural district Zimbabwe have resorted to placing beehives at the border of fields and villages (bio fencing) to protect themselves and their crops from elephants.

=== Assisted migration ===
Assisted migration is the act of moving plants or animals to a different habitat. It has been proposed as a way to rescue species which may not be able to disperse easily, have long generation times or have small populations. This strategy has already been implemented to save multiple tree species in North America. For instance, the Torreya Guardians have coordinated an assisted migration program to save the Torreya taxifolia from extinction.

== See also ==
- Atelopus varius
- Biodiversity loss
- Chytridiomycosis
- Ecosystem services
- Gastric-brooding frog
- Golden toad
- Global catastrophic risk
- Guajira stubfoot toad
- Keystone species
- Paleocene–Eocene Thermal Maximum
