= Sinervo =

Sinervo is a Finnish surname. Notable people with the surname include:

- Barry Sinervo (1961–2021), behavioral ecologist and evolutionary biologist
- Elvi Sinervo (1912–1986), Finnish writer
- Helena Sinervo (born 1961), Finnish poet and novelist
