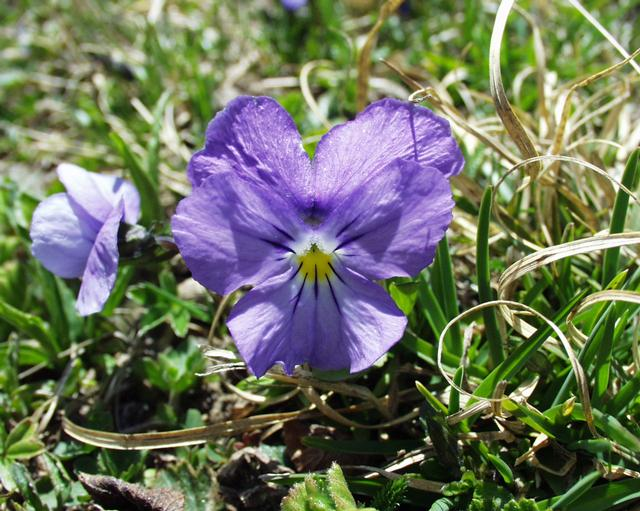

Scientific classification
- Kingdom: Plantae
- Clade: Tracheophytes
- Clade: Angiosperms
- Clade: Eudicots
- Clade: Rosids
- Order: Malpighiales
- Family: Violaceae
- Genus: Viola
- Species: V. calcarata

Binomial name
- Viola calcarata L.

= Viola calcarata =

Species of flowering plant

Viola calcarata is a species of genus Viola that grows on mountains of south-eastern Europe. It is commonly known as long-spurred violet or mountain violet. It is a herbaceous flowering perennial plant.

== Description ==
This plant, up to 15 cm tall, has short and glabrous stem, leafy in the lower part, prostrate, ascendent or suberect.

=== Leaves ===
This plant can show heterophylly: upper leaves can be different from lower leaves. The blade can be more or less elongated, from rounded to lanceolate, with crenate margin. At the base of the petiole there are stipules (5–15 mm long) of various form, from linear and entire stipules to stipules divided in many linear segments, pennate or palmate.

=== Flowers ===
Flower has a big corolla, 2 to 4 cm wide, of various colors: almost yellow in the center, usually with dark violet veins, the outer parts can be violet, blue, yellow or white. Lower petal has a spur 8–15 cm long. Flowering time is from May to August.

== Habitat ==
This is an alpine plant, usually growing from 1500 m to 2800 m, in meadows and pastures. Studies suggest that as the alpine climate becomes hotter, it is likely to be more challenged than most plants. In the Swiss Alps, for instance, it is projected to go extinct around 2050 even under the more optimistic climate change scenarios.
