= Energy Technology Perspectives =

Energy Technology Perspectives (ETP) is a publication on energy technology published by the International Energy Agency (IEA). The publication's goal is to illustrate how technologies can help achieve the objective of limiting the global temperature rise to 2°C and enhancing energy security.

In 2005, G8 leaders invited to the International Energy Agency contribute to the Gleneagles G8 Plan of Action on Climate Change, Clean Energy, and Sustainable Development. They tasked the IEA with providing advice on alternative scenarios and strategies for a "clean, clever, competitive energy future." The outcome of this initiative was the Energy Technology Perspectives, first published in 2006.

Energy Technology Perspectives (ETP) provides a long-term outlook on the global energy system, presenting main results up to the year 2050. The 2012 edition extended the analysis to include scenarios up to 2075. ETP models the global energy system under different scenarios, considering around 500 technology options.

Targeted at policymakers, energy experts, business leaders, and investors, the book aims to serve as a guide for decision-makers on energy trends when setting policy and business objectives related to energy technology. The book is complemented by an online component that includes data visualizations and downloadable data and figures. Information on the modeling methodology, assumptions, and results are also presented online.

== ETP 2023 ==
Energy Technology Perspectives 2023, published in January 2023.

Against the backdrop of the Covid-19 pandemic, and with the rise of global conflicts, specifically Russia's invasion of Ukraine, ETP 2023 put a spotlight on energy security issues and supply chains. Questions regarding the role of governments in shaping their industrial policy, energy security and supply chains in a secure manor are raised.

Chapters included in the document:

- Energy supply chains between transition and disruption
- Clean energy supply chains vulnerabilities
- Mining and materials production
- Technology manufacturing and installation
- Enabling infrastructure
- Policy priorities to address supply chain risks.

== Other publications in the IEA Energy Technology series ==
Energy Technology Perspectives scenarios are also the basis for other technology and sector focused IEA publications.

=== Transition to Sustainable Buildings ===
Transition to Sustainable Buildings presents detailed scenarios and strategies to 2050 and demonstrates how to reach deep energy and emissions reduction in the buildings sector through a combination of best available technologies and intelligent public policy. This publication is one of three end-use studies, together with industry and transport, which looks at the role of technologies and policies in transforming the way energy is used. It was published in June 2013.

=== Tracking Clean Energy Progress 2013 ===
The Tracking Clean Energy Progress 2013 is the IEA’s input to the Clean Energy Ministerial. It examines progress in the development and deployment of key clean energy technologies. Each technology and sector are tracked against interim 2020 targets in the IEA 2012 ETP 2°C scenario, which lays out pathways to a sustainable energy system in 2050. This report provides targeted recommendations to policy makers on how to scale up deployment of key clean energy technologies. The Clean Energy Ministerial is a global forum to share best practices and promote policies and programs that encourage and facilitate the transition to a global clean energy economy. It was published in April 2013.

=== Nordic Energy Technology Perspectives ===
Nordic Energy Technology Perspectives is the first regional edition of the Energy Technology Perspectives series. It assesses how the Nordic region can achieve a carbon-neutral energy system by 2050. It was published in January 2013.

== Previous Editions ==
=== ETP 2020 ===
Energy Technology Perspectives 2020 looks onto the different technologies required to achieve the zero-emission goal of the future. It reflects on the current state of play in clean energy technologies, the system transformations required, long-distance transport needs and innovation.

=== ETP 2017 ===
Energy Technology Perspectives 2017 focuses on the scaling of different clean energy technologies. It projects onto the potential of current clean energy methods, together with technological advancements and scaling, to transform the energy security and environmental sustainability for future decades.

=== ETP 2016 ===
Energy Technology Perspectives 2016 puts the spotlight on local governance policies and novel technologies and opportunities required to meet the climate goals set at the COP21 in Paris.

=== ETP 2015 ===
Energy Technology Perspectives 2015 identifies regulatory strategies and co-operative frameworks to advance innovation in areas like variable renewables, carbon capture and storage, and energy-intensive industrial sectors. It shows how emerging economies, and the People’s Republic of China in particular, can foster a low-carbon transition through innovation in energy technologies and policy.

=== ETP 2014 ===
Energy Technology Perspectives 2014 publication focuses on electricity’s potential to increase energy efficiency and reduce emissions in the long term. Limiting the long-term global temperature increase to 2 degrees remains a central objective of the work, and the report recognizes that installations of wind- and solar-energy infrastructure are meeting goals established toward that end. The book, subtitled "Harnessing Electricity’s Potential" explains that electricity is key to sustainable energy systems for the future and focuses on what this means for generation, distribution and end-use consumption.

ETP 2014 explores the possibility of "pushing the limits" in six areas:

- De-carbonizing energy supply: is solar the answer to a cleaner energy future?
- What role will natural gas play: flexibility vs. base load?, * Electrified transport: how quickly and far can we go?
- Can energy storage become a game-changer?
- What is the best way to finance low-carbon sources for electricity generation?
- How can India prepare for population growth-driven energy demand increases?

=== ETP 2012 ===
Energy Technology Perspectives 2012 (ETP 2012) presents global scenarios and strategies to 2050, a special chapter with scenario analysis to 2075 and detailed scenarios for nine world regions.

=== ETP 2010 ===
ETP 2010 builds on the success of earlier editions by providing updated scenarios with greater regional detail giving insights on which new technologies will be most important in the different regions of the world. It highlights the key technological challenges and opportunities in each of the main energy-using sectors and describes the new policies that will be needed to realize change.

=== ETP 2008 ===
The second edition of Energy Technology Perspectives, ETP 2008 addresses the need of ever-increasing energy supplies to sustain economic growth and development. The study contains technology road maps for all key energy sectors, including electricity generation, buildings, industry and transport.
