= Representative Concentration Pathway =

Projections used in climate change modeling

Different RCP scenarios result in different predicted greenhouse gas concentrations in the atmosphere (from 2000 to 2100). RCP8.5 would result in the highest greenhouse gas concentration (measured as CO_{2}-equivalents).

Representative Concentration Pathways (RCP) are climate change scenarios to project future greenhouse gas concentrations. These pathways (or trajectories) describe future greenhouse gas concentrations (not emissions) and have been formally adopted by the IPCC. The pathways describe different climate change scenarios, all of which were considered possible depending on the amount of greenhouse gases (GHG) emitted in the years to come. The four RCPs – originally RCP2.6, RCP4.5, RCP6, and RCP8.5 – are labelled after the expected changes in radiative forcing values from the year 1750 to the year 2100 (2.6, 4.5, 6, and 8.5 W/m^{2}, respectively). The IPCC Fifth Assessment Report (AR5) began to use these four pathways for climate modeling and research in 2014. The higher values mean higher greenhouse gas emissions and therefore higher global surface temperatures and more pronounced effects of climate change. The lower RCP values, on the other hand, are more desirable for humans but would require more stringent climate change mitigation efforts to achieve them.

In the IPCC's Sixth Assessment Report the original pathways are now being considered together with Shared Socioeconomic Pathways. There are three new RCPs, namely RCP1.9, RCP3.4 and RCP7. A short description of the RCPs is as follows: RCP 1.9 is a pathway that limits global warming to below 1.5 °C, the aspirational goal of the Paris Agreement. RCP 2.6 is a very stringent pathway. RCP 3.4 represents an intermediate pathway between the very stringent RCP2.6 and less stringent mitigation efforts associated with RCP4.5. RCP 4.5 is described by the IPCC as an intermediate scenario. In RCP 6, emissions peak around 2080, then decline. RCP7 is a baseline outcome rather than a mitigation target. In RCP 8.5—found in a study published in 2026 to be no longer plausible—emissions would continue to rise throughout the 21st century.

For the extended RCP2.6 scenario, global warming of 0.0 to 1.2 °C is projected for the late 23rd century (2281–2300 average), relative to 1986–2005. For the extended RCP8.5, global warming of 3.0 to 12.6 °C is projected over the same time period.

== Concentrations ==
The RCPs are consistent with a wide range of possible changes in future anthropogenic (i.e., human) greenhouse gas emissions, and aim to represent their atmospheric concentrations. Despite characterizing RCPs in terms of inputs, a key change from the 2007 to the 2014 IPCC report is that the RCPs ignore the carbon cycle by focusing on concentrations of greenhouse gases, not greenhouse gas inputs. The IPCC studies the carbon cycle separately, predicting higher ocean uptake of carbon corresponding to higher concentration pathways, but land carbon uptake is much more uncertain due to the combined effect of climate change and land use changes.

The four RCPs are consistent with certain socio-economic assumptions but are being substituted with the shared socioeconomic pathways which are anticipated to provide flexible descriptions of possible futures within each RCP. The RCP scenarios superseded the Special Report on Emissions Scenarios projections published in 2000 and were based on similar socio-economic models.

== Pathways used in modelling ==
=== RCP 1.9 ===
RCP 1.9 is a pathway that limits global warming to below 1.5 °C, the aspirational goal of the Paris Agreement.

=== RCP 2.6 ===
RCP 2.6 is a "very stringent" pathway. According to the IPCC, RCP 2.6 requires that carbon dioxide (CO_{2}) emissions start declining by 2020 and go to zero by 2100. It also requires that methane emissions (CH_{4}) go to approximately half the CH_{4} levels of 2020, and that sulphur dioxide (SO2) emissions decline to approximately 10% of those of 1980–1990. RCP 2.6 is the only scenario that requires net negative CO_{2} emissions near the end of the century. Net negative CO_{2} emissions means that in total, humans absorb more CO_{2} from the atmosphere than they release. These negative emissions are on average 2 Gigatons of CO_{2} per year (GtCO_{2}/yr). RCP 2.6 is likely to keep global temperature rise below 2 °C by 2100.

=== RCP 3.4 ===
RCP 3.4 represents an intermediate pathway between the "very stringent" RCP2.6 and less stringent mitigation efforts associated with RCP4.5. As well as just providing another option a variant of RCP3.4 includes considerable removal of greenhouse gases from the atmosphere.

=== RCP 4.5 ===
RCP 4.5 is described by the IPCC as an intermediate scenario. Emissions in RCP 4.5 peak around 2040, then decline. According to resource specialists, IPCC emission scenarios are biased towards exaggerated availability of fossil fuels reserves; RCP 4.5 is the most probable baseline scenario (no climate policies) taking into account the exhaustible character of non-renewable fuels.

According to the IPCC, RCP 4.5 requires that carbon dioxide (CO_{2}) emissions start declining by approximately 2045 to reach roughly half of the levels of 2050 by 2100. It also requires that methane emissions (CH_{4}) stop increasing by 2050 and decline somewhat to about 75% of the CH_{4} levels of 2040, and that sulphur dioxide (SO2) emissions decline to approximately 20% of those of 1980–1990. Like all the other RCPs, RCP 4.5 requires negative CO_{2} emissions (such as CO_{2} absorption by trees). For RCP 4.5, those negative emissions would be 2 Gigatons of CO_{2} per year (GtCO_{2}/yr). RCP 4.5 is more likely than not to result in global temperature rise between 2 °C and 3 °C, by 2100 with a mean sea level rise 35% higher than that of RCP 2.6. Many plant and animal species will be unable to adapt to the effects of RCP 4.5 and higher RCPs.

=== RCP 6 ===
In RCP 6, emissions peak around 2080, then decline. The RCP 6.0 scenario uses a high greenhouse gas emission rate and is a stabilisation scenario where total radiative forcing is stabilised after 2100 by employment of a range of technologies and strategies for reducing greenhouse gas emissions. 6.0 W/m^{2} refers to the radiative forcing reached by 2100. Projections for temperature according to RCP 6.0 include continuous global warming through 2100 where CO_{2} levels rise to 670 ppm by 2100, making the global temperature rise by about 3–4 °C by 2100.

=== RCP 7 ===
RCP7 is a baseline outcome rather than a mitigation target.

=== RCP 8.5 ===
In RCP 8.5 emissions continue to rise throughout the 21st century. RCP8.5 was generally taken as the basis for worst-case climate change scenarios. Since the publication of the IPCC Fifth Assessment Report (2014) the likelihood of this RCP has been debated, due to overestimation of projected coal outputs. On the other hand, many uncertainties remain on carbon cycle feedbacks, which could lead to warmer temperatures than projected in representative concentration pathways. RCP 8.5 is still used for predicting mid-century (and earlier) emissions based on current and stated policies. A study published on 7 April 2026 in Geoscientific Model Development concluded that emissions associated with RCP8.5 "have become implausible, based on trends in the costs of renewables, the emergence of climate policy and recent emission trends".

== Projections based on the RCPs ==
=== 21st century ===
Mid- and late 21st-century (2046–2065 and 2081–2100 averages, respectively) projections of global warming and global mean sea level rise from the IPCC Fifth Assessment Report (IPCC AR5 WG1) are tabulated below. The projections are relative to temperatures and sea levels in the late 20th to early 21st centuries (1986–2005 average). Temperature projections can be converted to a reference period of 1850–1900 or 1980–99 by adding 0.61 or 0.11 °C, respectively.

AR5 global warming increase (°C) projections
Scenario	2046–2065	2081–2100
Scenario	Mean (likely range)	Mean (likely range)
RCP2.6	1.0 (0.4 to 1.6)	1.0 (0.3 to 1.7)
RCP4.5	1.4 (0.9 to 2.0)	1.8 (1.1 to 2.6)
RCP6	1.3 (0.8 to 1.8)	2.2 (1.4 to 3.1)
RCP8.5	2.0 (1.4 to 2.6)	3.7 (2.6 to 4.8)

Across all RCPs, global mean temperature is projected to rise by 0.4 to 2.6°C (1.5°C) by the mid 21st century and by 0.3 to 4.8°C (2.55°C) by the late 21st century.

According to a 2021 study in which plausible AR5 and RCP scenarios of CO_{2} emissions are selected,

AR5 and RCP Scenarios and temperature change projections
RCP Scenario	Range of Global Mean Temperature Increase (Celsius) – 2100 from pre-Industrial baseline
RCP 1.9	≈1 to ≈1.5
RCP 2.6	≈1.5 to ≈2
RCP 3.4	≈2 to ≈2.4
RCP 4.5	≈2.5 to ≈3
RCP 6.0	≈3 to ≈3.5
RCP 7.5	≈4
RCP 8.5	≈5

AR5 global mean sea level (m) increase projections
Scenario	2046–2065	2081–2100
Scenario	Mean (likely range)	Mean (likely range)
RCP2.6	0.24 (0.17 to 0.32)	0.40 (0.26 to 0.55)
RCP4.5	0.26 (0.19 to 0.33)	0.47 (0.32 to 0.63)
RCP6	0.25 (0.18 to 0.32)	0.48 (0.33 to 0.63)
RCP8.5	0.30 (0.22 to 0.38)	0.63 (0.45 to 0.82)

Across all RCPs, global mean sea level is projected to rise by 0.17 to 0.38 meters (0.275 meters) by the mid 21st century and by 0.26 to 0.82 meters (0.54 meters) by the late 21st century.

=== 23rd century ===
The IPCC Fifth Assessment Report also projected changes in climate beyond the 21st century. The extended RCP2.6 pathway assumes sustained net negative anthropogenic GHG emissions after the year 2070. Meanwhile, the extended RCP8.5 pathway assumes continued anthropogenic GHG emissions after 2100. In the extended RCP 2.6 pathway, atmospheric CO_{2} concentrations reach around 360 ppmv by 2300, while in the extended RCP8.5 pathway, CO_{2} concentrations reach around 2000 ppmv in 2250, which is nearly seven times the pre-industrial level.

For the extended RCP2.6 scenario, global warming of 0.0 to 1.2°C (0.6°C) is projected for the late 23rd century (2281–2300 average), relative to 1986–2005. For the extended RCP8.5, global warming of 3.0 to 12.6°C (7.8°C) is projected over the same time period.

Between these RCPs, global warming of 1.5 to 6.9°C (4.2°C) is projected for the late 23rd century (2281-2300 average).

== See also ==
- Coupled Model Intercomparison Project – Collaboration for climate change study
- IPCC Sixth Assessment Report – Intergovernmental report on climate change
- Special Report on Emissions Scenarios – 2000 report by the Intergovernmental Panel on Climate Change
- Shared Socioeconomic Pathways – Climate change scenarios
