= Shared Socioeconomic Pathways =

Climate change scenarios

Predicted atmospheric CO₂ concentrations for different shared socioeconomic pathways (SSPs) across the 21st century (projected by MAGICC7, a simple/reduced complexity climate model). Each data point represents an average of simulated values generated from five integrated assessment models.

Shared Socioeconomic Pathways (SSPs) are climate change scenarios of projected socioeconomic global changes up to 2100 as defined in the IPCC Sixth Assessment Report on climate change in 2021. They are used to derive greenhouse gas emissions scenarios with different climate policies. The SSPs provide narratives describing alternative socio-economic developments. These storylines are a qualitative description of logic relating elements of the narratives to each other. In terms of quantitative elements, they provide data accompanying the scenarios on national population, urbanization and GDP (per capita). The SSPs can be quantified with various Integrated Assessment Models (IAMs) to explore possible future pathways both with regard to socioeconomic and climate pathways.

The five scenarios are:

- SSP1: Sustainability ("Taking the Green Road")
- SSP2: "Middle of the Road"
- SSP3: Regional Rivalry ("A Rocky Road")
- SSP4: Inequality ("A Road Divided")
- SSP5: Fossil-fueled Development ("Taking the Highway")

There are also ongoing efforts to downscaling European shared socioeconomic pathways (SSPs) for agricultural and food systems, combined with representative concentration pathways (RCP) to regionally specific, alternative socioeconomic and climate scenarios.

== Descriptions of the SSPs ==
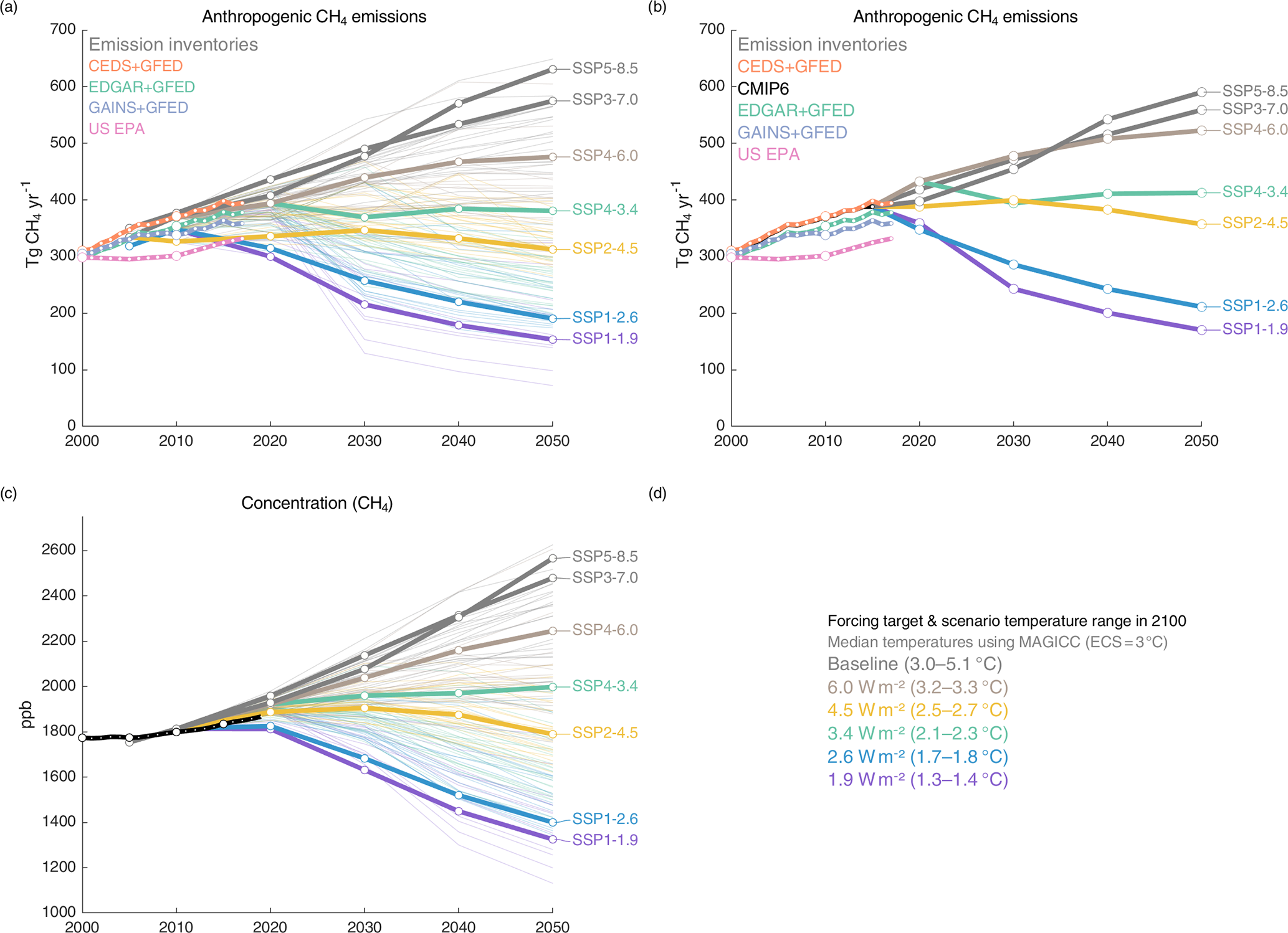
Methane emissions projections for different shared socioeconomic pathways

SSPs mapped in the challenges to mitigation/adaptation space

=== SSP1: Sustainability (Taking the Green Road) ===
"The world shifts gradually, but extensively, toward a more sustainable path, emphasizing more inclusive development that respects predicted environmental boundaries. Management of the global commons slowly improves, educational and health investments accelerate the demographic transition, and the emphasis on economic growth shifts toward a broader emphasis on human well-being. Driven by an increasing commitment to achieving development goals, inequality is reduced both across and within countries. Consumption is oriented toward low material growth and lower resource and energy intensity."

=== SSP2: Middle of the road ===
"The world follows a path in which social, economic, and technological trends do not shift markedly from historical patterns. Development and income growth proceeds unevenly, with some countries making relatively good progress while others fall short of expectations. Global and national institutions work toward but make slow progress in achieving sustainable development goals. Environmental systems experience degradation, although there are some improvements and overall the intensity of resource and energy use declines. Global population growth is moderate and levels off in the second half of the century. Income inequality persists or improves only slowly and challenges to reducing vulnerability to societal and environmental changes remain."

=== SSP3: Regional rivalry (A Rocky Road) ===
"A resurgent nationalism, concerns about competitiveness and security, and regional conflicts push countries to increasingly focus on domestic or, at most, regional issues. Policies shift over time to become increasingly oriented toward national and regional security issues. Countries focus on achieving energy and food security goals within their own regions at the expense of broader-based development. Investments in education and technological development decline. Economic development is slow, consumption is material-intensive, and inequalities persist or worsen over time. Population growth is low in industrialized and high in developing countries. A low international priority for addressing environmental concerns leads to strong environmental degradation in some regions."

=== SSP4: Inequality (A Road Divided) ===
"Highly unequal investments in human capital, combined with increasing disparities in economic opportunity and political power, lead to increasing inequalities and stratification both across and within countries. Over time, a gap widens between an internationally-connected society that contributes to knowledge- and capital-intensive sectors of the global economy, and a fragmented collection of lower-income, poorly educated societies that work in a labor intensive, low-tech economy. Social cohesion degrades and conflict and unrest become increasingly common. Technology development is high in the high-tech economy and sectors. The globally connected energy sector diversifies, with investments in both carbon-intensive fuels like coal and unconventional oil, but also low-carbon energy sources. Environmental policies focus on local issues around middle and high income areas."

=== SSP5: Fossil-Fueled Development (Taking the Highway) ===
"This world places increasing faith in competitive markets, innovation and participatory societies to produce rapid technological progress and development of human capital as the path to sustainable development. Global markets are increasingly integrated. There are also strong investments in health, education, and institutions to enhance human and social capital. At the same time, the push for economic and social development is coupled with the exploitation of abundant fossil fuel resources and the adoption of resource and energy intensive lifestyles around the world. All these factors lead to rapid growth of the global economy, while global population peaks and declines in the 21st century. Local environmental problems like air pollution are successfully managed. There is faith in the ability to effectively manage social and ecological systems, including by geo-engineering if necessary."

== SSP temperature projections from the IPCC Sixth Assessment Report ==
The IPCC Sixth Assessment Report assessed the projected temperature outcomes of a set of five scenarios that are based on the framework of the SSPs. The names of these scenarios consist of the SSP on which they are based (SSP1-SSP5), combined with the expected level of radiative forcing in the year 2100 (1.9 to 8.5 W/m^{2}) compared with the pre-industrial baseline of 1750. This results in scenario names SSPx-y.z as listed below.

Shared Socioeconomic Pathways in the IPCC Sixth Assessment Report
SSP	Scenario	Estimated warming (2041–2060)	Estimated warming (2081–2100)	Very likely range in °C (2081–2100)
SSP1-1.9	very low GHG emissions: CO_{2} emissions cut to net zero around 2050	1.6 °C	1.4 °C	1.0 – 1.8
SSP1-2.6	low GHG emissions: CO_{2} emissions cut to net zero around 2075	1.7 °C	1.8 °C	1.3 – 2.4
SSP2-4.5	intermediate GHG emissions: CO_{2} emissions around current levels until 2050, then falling but not reaching net zero by 2100	2.0 °C	2.7 °C	2.1 – 3.5
SSP3-7.0	high GHG emissions: CO_{2} emissions double by 2100	2.1 °C	3.6 °C	2.8 – 4.6
SSP5-8.5	very high GHG emissions: CO_{2} emissions triple by 2075	2.4 °C	4.4 °C	3.3 – 5.7

The IPCC Sixth report did not estimate the likelihoods of the scenarios.

In 2020, a commentary described SSP5–8.5 as highly unlikely, SSP3–7.0 as unlikely, and SSP2–4.5 as likely.

In January 2025, a revised assessment by Hausfather estimated median warming under current policies at about 2.7 °C by 2100, with the 5th–95th percentile of central estimates spanning 2.3–3.0 °C; including emissions and climate-system uncertainties widens the range to roughly 1.9–3.7 °C. The paper also states that current-policy emissions pathways tend to align most closely with, or fall slightly below, SSP2-4.5 rather than SSP3-7.0.

== See also ==
- Climate change scenario
- Coupled Model Intercomparison Project
- Representative Concentration Pathway
- Special Report on Emissions Scenarios (published in 2000)
