= Climate change scenario =

Hypothetical representation of potential future conditions

A climate change scenario is a hypothetical future based on a "set of key driving forces" behind climate change. Scenarios explore the long-term effectiveness of climate change mitigation and adaptation. Closely related to climate change scenarios are pathways, which are more concrete and action-oriented. However, in the literature, the terms scenarios and pathways are often used interchangeably.

Many parameters influence climate change scenarios. Three important parameters are the number of people (and population growth), their economic activity and new technologies. Economic and energy models, such as World3 and POLES, quantify the effects of these parameters.

Climate change scenarios exist at a national, regional or global scale. Countries use scenario studies in order to better understand their decisions. This is useful when they are developing their adaptation plans or nationally determined contributions. International goals for mitigating climate change like the Paris Agreement are based on studying these scenarios. For example, the IPCC Special Report on Global Warming of 1.5 °C was a "key scientific input" into the 2018 United Nations Climate Change Conference. Various pathways are considered in the report, describing scenarios for mitigation of global warming. Pathways include for example portfolios for energy supply and carbon dioxide removal.

== Terminology ==
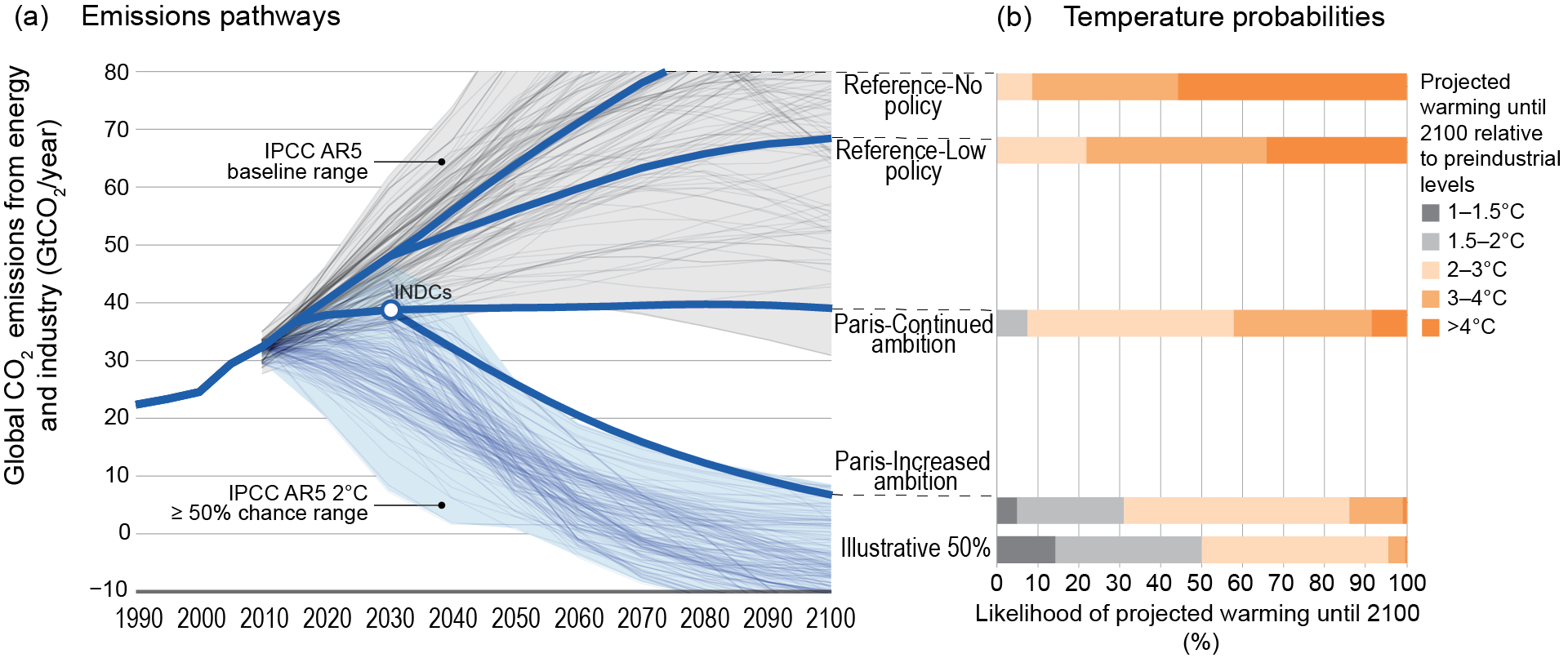
Four climate change scenarios, based on 2015 data. Left: emissions pathways following the scenarios of (1) no policy, (2) current policy, (3) meeting the governments’ announcements with constant country decarbonization rates past 2030, and (4) meeting the governments’ announcements with higher rates of decarbonization past 2030. Right: global temperatures, depending on the amount of greenhouse gases emitted in each of the four scenarios.

The IPCC Sixth Assessment Report defines scenario as follows: "A plausible description of how the future may develop based on a [...] set of assumptions about key driving forces and relationships." A set of scenarios shows a range of possible futures.

Scenarios are not predictions. Scenarios help decision makers to understand what will be the effects of a decision.

The concept of pathways is closely related. The formal definition of pathways is as follows: "The temporal evolution of natural and/or human systems towards a future state. [...] Pathway approaches [...] involve various dynamics, goals, and actors across different scales."

In other words: pathways are a roadmap which list actions that need to be taken to make a scenario come true. Decision makers can use a pathway to make a plan, e.g. with regards to the timing of fossil-fuel phase out or the reduction of fossil fuel subsidies.

Pathways are more concrete and action-oriented compared to scenarios. They provide a roadmap for achieving desired climate targets. There can be several pathways to achieve the same scenario end point in future.

In the literature the terms scenarios and pathways are often used interchangeably. The IPCC publications on the physical science basis tend to use scenarios more, whereas the publications on mitigation tend to use modelled emission and mitigation pathways as a term.

== Types ==
There are the following types of scenarios:

- baseline scenarios
- concentrations scenarios
- emissions scenarios
- mitigation scenarios
- reference scenarios
- socio economic scenarios.

A baseline scenario is used as a reference for comparison against an alternative scenario, e.g., a mitigation scenario. A wide range of quantitative projections of greenhouse gas emissions have been produced. The "SRES" scenarios are "baseline" emissions scenarios (i.e., they assume that no future efforts are made to limit emissions), and have been frequently used in the scientific literature (see Special Report on Emissions Scenarios for details).

== Purpose ==
Climate change scenarios can be thought of as stories of possible futures. They allow the description of factors that are difficult to quantify, such as governance, social structures, and institutions. There is considerable variety among scenarios, ranging from variants of sustainable development, to the collapse of social, economic, and environmental systems.

== Factors affecting future GHG emissions ==
The following parameters influence what the scenarios look like: future population levels, economic activity, the structure of governance, social values, and patterns of technological change. No strong patterns were found in the relationship between economic activity and GHG emissions. Economic growth was found to be compatible with increasing or decreasing GHG emissions. In the latter case, emissions growth is mediated by increased energy efficiency, shifts to non-fossil energy sources, and/or shifts to a post-industrial (service-based) economy.

Factors affecting the emission projections include:

- Population projections: All other factors being equal, lower population projections result in lower emissions projections.
- Economic development: Economic activity is a dominant driver of energy demand and thus of GHG emissions.
- Energy use: Future changes in energy systems are a fundamental determinant of future GHG emissions.
  - Energy intensity: This is the total primary energy supply (TPES) per unit of GDP. In all of the baseline scenarios assessments, energy intensity was projected to improve significantly over the 21st century. The uncertainty range in projected energy intensity was large.
  - Carbon intensity: This is the CO_{2} emissions per unit of TPES. Compared with other scenarios, Fisher et al. (2007) found that the carbon intensity was more constant in scenarios where no climate policy had been assumed. The uncertainty range in projected carbon intensity was large. At the high end of the range, some scenarios contained the projection that energy technologies without CO_{2} emissions would become competitive without climate policy. These projections were based on the assumption of increasing fossil fuel prices and rapid technological progress in carbon-free technologies. Scenarios with a low improvement in carbon intensity coincided with scenarios that had a large fossil fuel base, less resistance to coal consumption, or lower technology development rates for fossil-free technologies.
- Land-use change: Land-use change plays an important role in climate change, impacting on emissions, sequestration and albedo. One of the dominant drivers in land-use change is food demand. Population and economic growth are the most significant drivers of food demand.

In producing scenarios, an important consideration is how social and economic development will progress in developing countries. If, for example, developing countries were to follow a development pathway similar to the current industrialized countries, it could lead to a very large increase in emissions. Emissions do not only depend on the growth rate of the economy. Other factors include the structural changes in the production system, technological patterns in sectors such as energy, geographical distribution of human settlements and urban structures (this affects, for example, transportation requirements), consumption patterns (e.g., housing patterns, leisure activities, etc.), and trade patterns the degree of protectionism and the creation of regional trading blocks can affect availability to technology.

In the majority of studies, the following relationships were found (but are not proof of causation):

- Rising GHGs: This was associated with scenarios having a growing, post-industrial economy with globalization, mostly with low government intervention and generally high levels of competition. Income equality declined within nations, but there was no clear pattern in social equity or international income equality.
- Falling GHGs: In some of these scenarios, GDP rose. Other scenarios showed economic activity limited at an ecologically sustainable level. Scenarios with falling emissions had a high level of government intervention in the economy. The majority of scenarios showed increased social equity and income equality within and among nations.

Predicted trends for greenhouse gas emissions are shown in different formats:

- Needed emissions cuts
- Pledges
- Recent and currently remaining carbon budget

== Mitigation scenarios ==
Scenarios of global greenhouse gas emissions. If all countries achieve their current Paris Agreement pledges, average warming by 2100 will go far beyond the target of the Paris Agreement to keep warming "well below 2°C".

Climate change mitigation scenarios are possible futures in which global warming is reduced by deliberate actions, such as a comprehensive switch to energy sources other than fossil fuels. These are actions that minimize emissions so atmospheric greenhouse gas concentrations are stabilized at levels that restrict the adverse consequences of climate change. Using these scenarios, the examination of the impacts of different carbon prices on an economy is enabled within the framework of different levels of global aspirations.

The Paris Agreement has the goal to keep the increase of global temperature below 2 °C, preferably below 1.5 °C above pre-industrial levels to reduce effects of climate change. A typical mitigation scenario is constructed by selecting a long-range target, such as a desired atmospheric concentration of carbon dioxide (CO_{2}), and then fitting the actions to the target, for example by placing a cap on net global and national emissions of greenhouse gases.

=== Concentration scenarios ===
This figure depicts the rates at which global CO_{2} emissions must decline after 2024 to limit the global temperature increase to 1.5, 1.7, or 2.0 degrees Celsius without relying on net-negative emissions.

Contributions to climate change, whether they cool or warm the Earth, are often described in terms of the radiative forcing or imbalance they introduce to the planet's energy budget. Now and in the future, anthropogenic carbon dioxide is believed to be the major component of this forcing, and the contribution of other components is often quantified in terms of "parts-per-million carbon dioxide equivalent" (ppm CO_{2}e), or the increment/decrement in carbon dioxide concentrations which would create a radiative forcing of the same magnitude.

==== 450 ppm ====
The BLUE scenarios in the IEA's Energy Technology Perspectives publication of 2008 describe pathways to a long-range concentration of 450 ppm. Joseph Romm has sketched how to achieve this target through the application of 14 wedges.

World Energy Outlook 2008, mentioned above, also describes a "450 Policy Scenario", in which extra energy investments to 2030 amount to $9.3 trillion over the Reference Scenario. The scenario also features, after 2020, the participation of major economies such as China and India in a global cap-and-trade scheme initially operating in OECD and European Union countries. Also the less conservative 450 ppm scenario calls for extensive deployment of negative emissions, i.e. the removal of CO_{2} from the atmosphere. According to the International Energy Agency (IEA) and OECD, "Achieving lower concentration targets (450 ppm) depends significantly on the use of BECCS".

==== 550 ppm ====
This is the target advocated (as an upper bound) in the Stern Review. As approximately a doubling of CO_{2} levels relative to preindustrial times, it implies a temperature increase of about three degrees, according to conventional estimates of climate sensitivity. Pacala and Socolow list 15 "wedges", any 7 of which in combination should suffice to keep CO_{2} levels below 550 ppm.

The International Energy Agency's World Energy Outlook report for 2008 describes a "Reference Scenario" for the world's energy future "which assumes no new government policies beyond those already adopted by mid-2008", and then a "550 Policy Scenario" in which further policies are adopted, a mixture of "cap-and-trade systems, sectoral agreements and national measures". In the Reference Scenario, between 2006 and 2030 the world invests $26.3 trillion in energy-supply infrastructure; in the 550 Policy Scenario, a further $4.1 trillion is spent in this period, mostly on efficiency increases which deliver fuel cost savings of over $7 trillion.

== Commonly used pathway descriptions ==
Closely related to climate change scenarios are pathways, which are more concrete and action-oriented.

The IPCC assessment reports talk about the following types of pathways:

- 1.5°C pathway
- Adaptation pathways
- Climate-resilient pathways
- Development pathways
- Emission pathways
- Mitigation pathways
- Non-overshoot pathways
- Overshoot pathways
- Representative Concentration Pathways (RCPs)
- Shared Socio-economic Pathways (SSPs)
- Transformation pathways

=== Representative Concentration Pathway ===
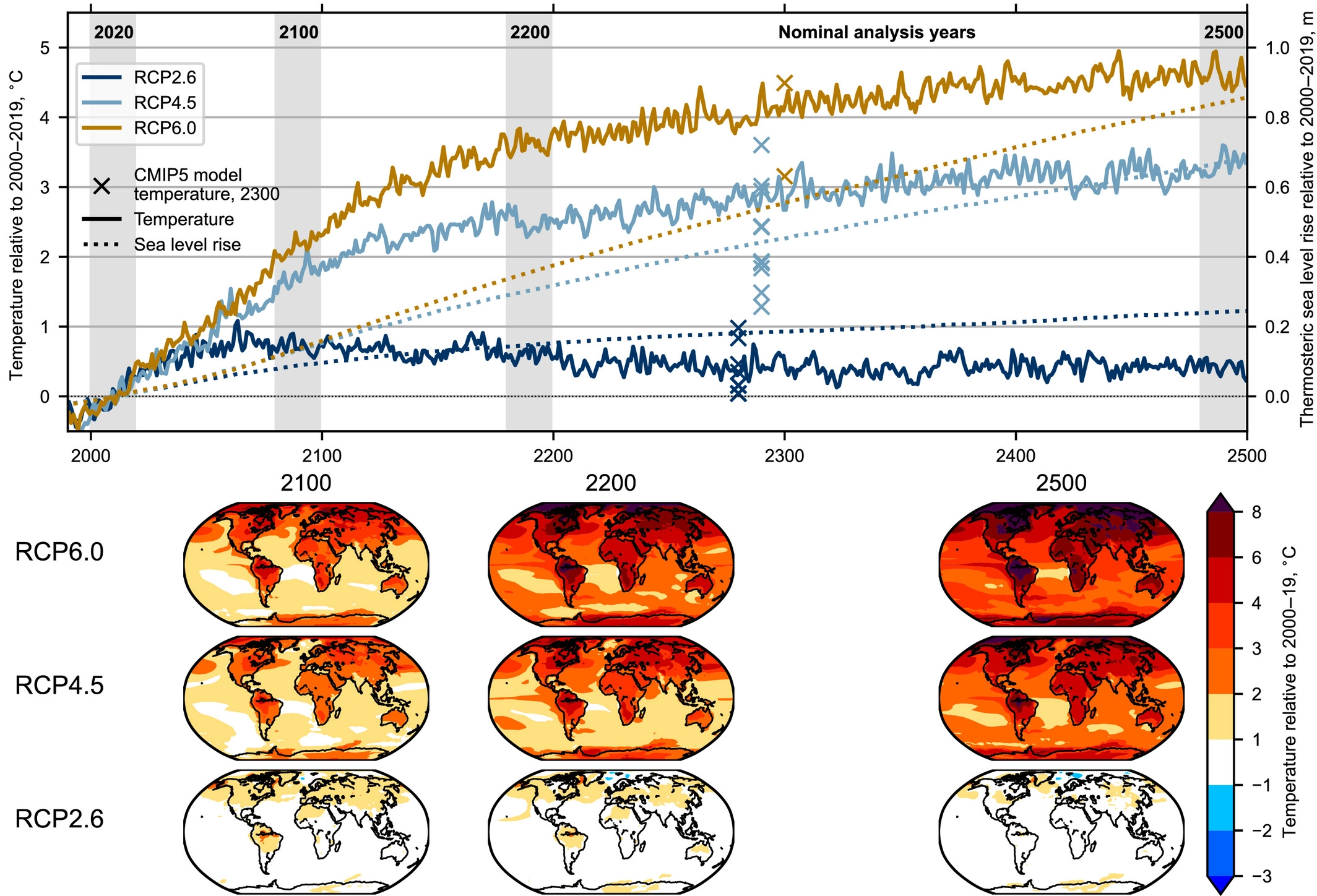
Global mean near-surface air temperature and thermosteric sea-level rise anomalies relative to the 2000–2019 mean for RCP (Representative Concentration Pathway) climate change scenarios

Different RCP scenarios result in different predicted greenhouse gas concentrations in the atmosphere (from 2000 to 2100). RCP8.5 would result in the highest greenhouse gas concentration (measured as CO_{2}-equivalents).

Representative Concentration Pathways (RCP) are climate change scenarios to project future greenhouse gas concentrations. These pathways (or trajectories) describe future greenhouse gas concentrations (not emissions) and have been formally adopted by the IPCC. The pathways describe different climate change scenarios, all of which were considered possible depending on the amount of greenhouse gases (GHG) emitted in the years to come. The four RCPs – originally RCP2.6, RCP4.5, RCP6, and RCP8.5 – are labelled after the expected changes in radiative forcing values from the year 1750 to the year 2100 (2.6, 4.5, 6, and 8.5 W/m^{2}, respectively). The IPCC Fifth Assessment Report (AR5) began to use these four pathways for climate modeling and research in 2014. The higher values mean higher greenhouse gas emissions and therefore higher global surface temperatures and more pronounced effects of climate change. The lower RCP values, on the other hand, are more desirable for humans but would require more stringent climate change mitigation efforts to achieve them.

In the IPCC's Sixth Assessment Report the original pathways are now being considered together with Shared Socioeconomic Pathways. There are three new RCPs, namely RCP1.9, RCP3.4 and RCP7. A short description of the RCPs is as follows: RCP 1.9 is a pathway that limits global warming to below 1.5 °C, the aspirational goal of the Paris Agreement. RCP 2.6 is a very stringent pathway. RCP 3.4 represents an intermediate pathway between the very stringent RCP2.6 and less stringent mitigation efforts associated with RCP4.5. RCP 4.5 is described by the IPCC as an intermediate scenario. In RCP 6, emissions peak around 2080, then decline. RCP7 is a baseline outcome rather than a mitigation target. In RCP 8.5—found in a study published in 2026 to be no longer plausible—emissions would continue to rise throughout the 21st century.

For the extended RCP2.6 scenario, global warming of 0.0 to 1.2 °C is projected for the late 23rd century (2281–2300 average), relative to 1986–2005. For the extended RCP8.5, global warming of 3.0 to 12.6 °C is projected over the same time period.

=== Shared Socioeconomic Pathways ===
Predicted atmospheric CO₂ concentrations for different shared socioeconomic pathways (SSPs) across the 21st century (projected by MAGICC7, a simple/reduced complexity climate model). Each data point represents an average of simulated values generated from five integrated assessment models.

Shared Socioeconomic Pathways (SSPs) are climate change scenarios of projected socioeconomic global changes up to 2100 as defined in the IPCC Sixth Assessment Report on climate change in 2021. They are used to derive greenhouse gas emissions scenarios with different climate policies. The SSPs provide narratives describing alternative socio-economic developments. These storylines are a qualitative description of logic relating elements of the narratives to each other. In terms of quantitative elements, they provide data accompanying the scenarios on national population, urbanization and GDP (per capita). The SSPs can be quantified with various Integrated Assessment Models (IAMs) to explore possible future pathways both with regard to socioeconomic and climate pathways.

The five scenarios are:

- SSP1: Sustainability ("Taking the Green Road")
- SSP2: "Middle of the Road"
- SSP3: Regional Rivalry ("A Rocky Road")
- SSP4: Inequality ("A Road Divided")
- SSP5: Fossil-fueled Development ("Taking the Highway")

There are also ongoing efforts to downscaling European shared socioeconomic pathways (SSPs) for agricultural and food systems, combined with representative concentration pathways (RCP) to regionally specific, alternative socioeconomic and climate scenarios.

== National climate (change) projections ==
To explore a wide range of plausible climatic outcomes and to enhance confidence in the projections, national climate change projections are often generated from multiple general circulation models (GCMs). Such climate ensembles can take the form of perturbed physics ensembles (PPE), multi-model ensembles (MME), or initial condition ensembles (ICE). As the spatial resolution of the underlying GCMs is typically quite coarse, the projections are often downscaled, either dynamically using regional climate models (RCMs), or statistically. Some projections include data from areas which are larger than the national boundaries, e.g. to more fully evaluate catchment areas of transboundary rivers.

Various countries have produced their national climate projections with feedback and/or interaction with stakeholders. Such engagement efforts have helped tailoring the climate information to the stakeholders' needs, including the provision of sector-specific climate indicators such as degree-heating days.

Over 30 countries have reported national climate projections / scenarios in their most recent submissions to the United Nations Framework Convention on Climate Change. Many European governments have also funded national information portals on climate change.

- Australia: CCIA
- California: Cal-Adapt
- Netherlands: KNMI'14
- Switzerland: CH2011 / CH2018
- UK: UKCP09 / UKCP18

For countries which lack adequate resources to develop their own climate change projections, organisations such as UNDP or FAO have sponsored development of projections and national adaptation programmes (NAPAs).

Decision processes, such as decisionmaking under deep uncertainty, may use multiple climate scenarios to evaluate vulnerabilities and function for actions under many different potential futures.

== See also ==
- Carbon budget
- Climate sensitivity
- Climate stabilization wedge
- CMIP
- Copernicus Programme
- Decarbonization pathways
