= Barry Sinervo =

Behavioral ecologist and evolutionary biologist (1961–2021)

Barry R. Sinervo (1961–2021) was a behavioral ecologist and evolutionary biologist. He was a full professor at University of California Santa Cruz where his research interests included game theory, climate change, herpetology, and animal behavior. One of his major discoveries was of a rock-paper-scissors game in side-blotched lizard mating behaviour. He also discovered evidence of the Baldwin effect in the side-blotched lizard. Sinervo was born in Port Arthur, Ontario, Canada, and educated at Dalhousie University, Nova Scotia, and the University of Washington, Seattle. He died from cancer at age 60 on March 15, 2021.

== Honors ==
A species of lizard was named after Sinervo, Phymaturus sinervoi Scolaro et al., 2012.
