= Climate commitment =

Unavoidable future climate change due to inertial effects

The ongoing buildup of long-lived greenhouse gases in Earth's atmosphere, whose warming influence has nearly doubled since 1979, shows mankind's influence on the global climate.

Climate commitment describes the fact that Earth's climate reacts with a delay to influencing factors ("climate forcings") such as the growth and the greater presence of greenhouse gases. Climate commitment studies attempt to assess the amount of future global warming that is "committed" under the assumption of some constant or some evolving level of forcing. The constant level often used for illustrative purposes is that due to CO_{2} doubling or quadrupling relative to the pre-industrial level; or the present level of forcing.

== Definition ==
Climate commitment is the "unavoidable future climate change resulting from inertia in the geophysical and socio-economic systems". Different types of climate change commitment are discussed in the literature. These include the "constant composition commitment"; the "constant emissions commitment" and the "zero emissions commitment".

== Basic idea ==
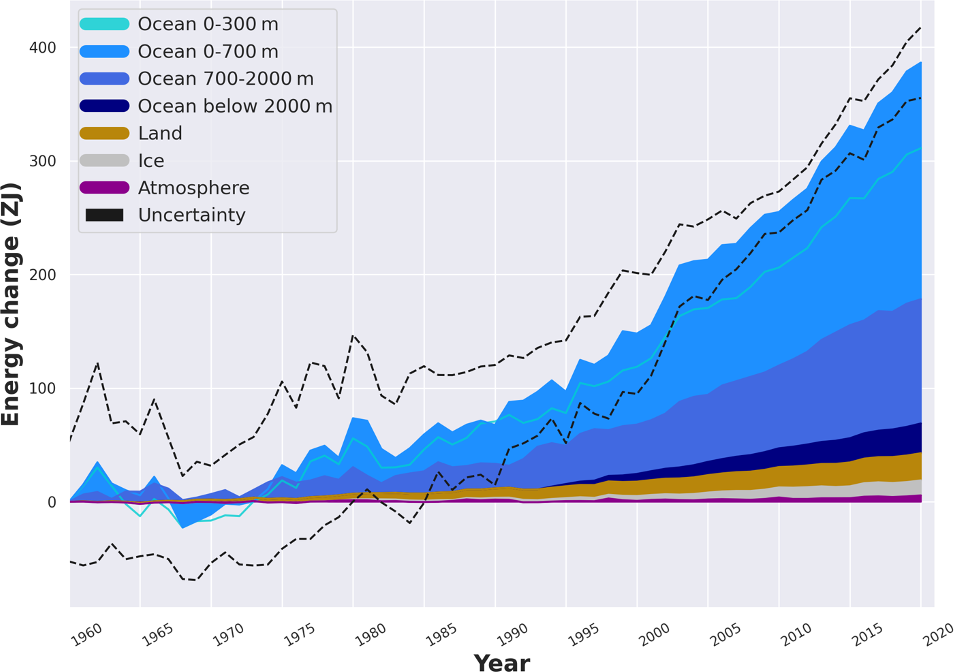
The accumulation of excess heat in the ocean, at ever greater depths, measures global warming that has already become "irreversible" in the near term

If a perturbation — such as an increase in greenhouse gases or solar activity — is applied to Earth's climate system the response will not be immediate, principally because of the large heat capacity and thermal inertia of the oceans.

As an analogue, consider the heating of a thin metal plate (by the sun or by a flame): the plate will warm relatively quickly. If a thick metal block is heated instead, it will take much longer for the entire block to reach equilibrium with the imposed heating because of its higher heat capacity.

Land only stores heat in the top few meters. Ocean water, by contrast, can move vertically and store heat within the ocean's depth (convection). This is why the land surface is observed to warm more than the oceans. It also explains the large difference in global surface temperature response between

- "transient" climate simulations in which the planet's incoming/outgoing energy flows are substantially out-of-balance and only a shallow ocean model might be utilized, and
- "equilibrium" climate simulations in which the energy flows approach a new balance and a full ocean model is needed.

The "commitment" can apply to variables other than temperature: because of the long mixing time for heat into the deep ocean, a given surface warming commits to centuries of sea level rise from thermal expansion of the ocean. Also once a certain threshold is crossed, it is likely that a slow melting of the Greenland ice sheet will commit us to a sea level rise of 5m over millennia.

== Models ==
Recent models forecast that even in the unlikely event of greenhouse gases stabilizing at present levels, the Earth would warm by an additional 0.5°C by 2100, a similar rise in temperature to that seen during the 20th century. In 2050, as much as 64% of that commitment would be due to past natural forcings. Over time, their contribution compared to the human influence will diminish. Overall, the warming commitment at 2005 greenhouse gas levels could exceed 1°C. As ocean waters expand in response to this warming, global sea levels would mount by about 10 centimeters during that time. These models do not take into account ice cap and glacier melting; including those climate feedback effects would give a 1–1.5°C estimated temperature increase.

== History ==
The concept has been discussed as far back as 1995 in the IPCC TAR and in the SAR.

== Misuse ==
Climate commitment studies span a range of emissions scenarios which are intimately tied to past, present and future human choices. The "commitment" concept is misused when worst cases are asserted to be inevitable regardless of social agency. Models rather indicate that additional surface warming can be halted almost simultaneous with rapid emissions reductions.

== See also ==
- Climate change scenario
- Climate inertia
- Climate sensitivity
