= Climate inertia =

Slow response of complex feedback systems

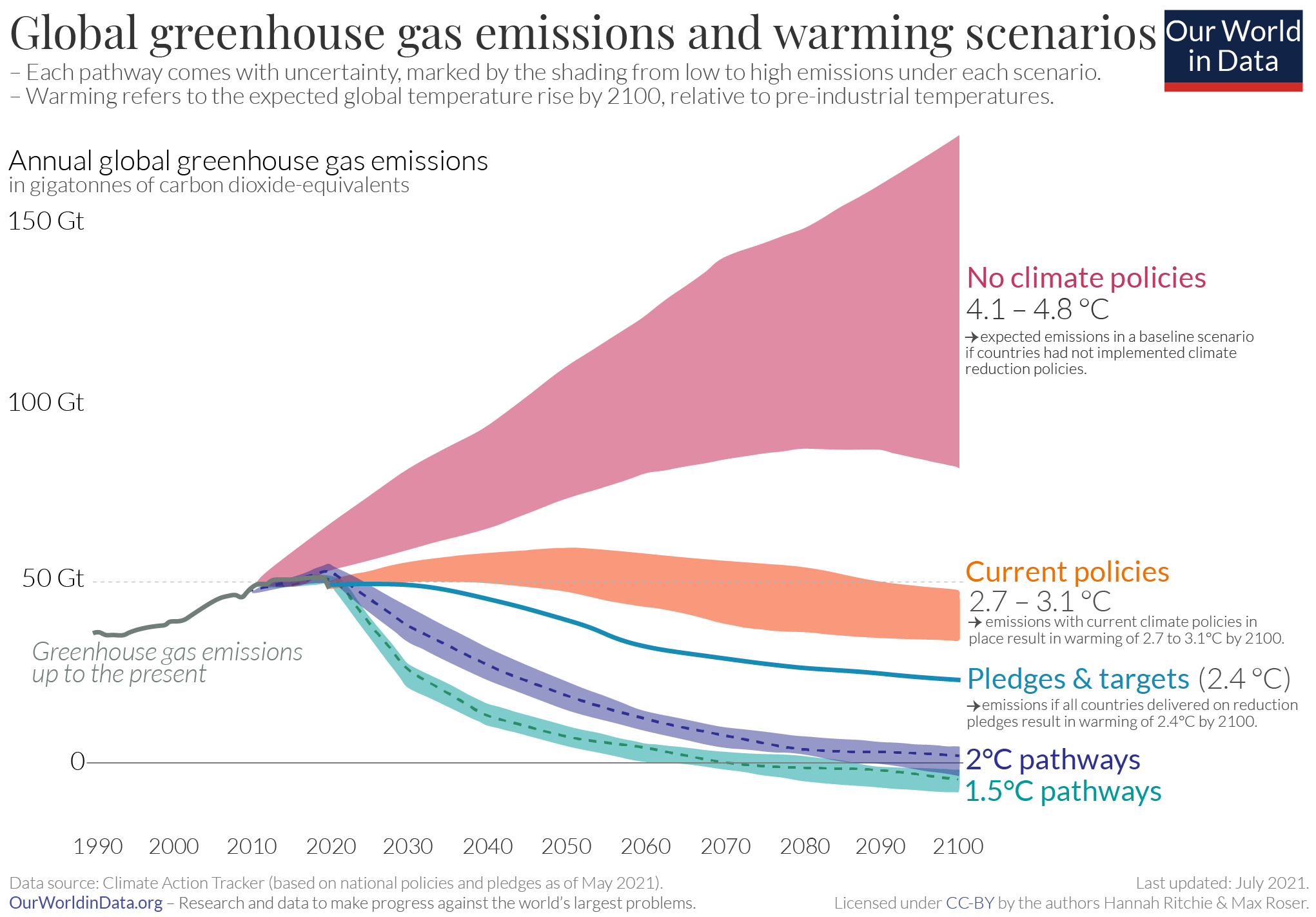
Societal elements of inertia work to prevent abrupt shifts within pathways of greenhouse gas emissions, while physical inertia of the Earth system acts to delay the surface temperature response.

Climate inertia or climate change inertia is the phenomenon by which a planet's climate system shows a resistance or slowness to deviate away from a given dynamic state. It can accompany stability and other effects of feedback within complex systems, and includes the inertia exhibited by physical movements of matter and exchanges of energy. The term is a colloquialism used to encompass and loosely describe a set of interactions that extend the timescales around climate sensitivity. Inertia has been associated with the drivers of, and the responses to, climate change.

Increasing fossil-fuel carbon emissions are a primary inertial driver of change to Earth's climate during recent decades, and have risen along with the collective socioeconomic inertia of its 8 billion human inhabitants. Many system components have exhibited inertial responses to this driver, also known as a forcing. The rate of rise in global surface temperature (GST) has especially been resisted by 1) the thermal inertia of the planet's surface, primarily its ocean, and 2) inertial behavior within its carbon cycle feedback. Various other biogeochemical feedbacks have contributed further resiliency. Energy stored in the ocean following the inertial responses principally determines near-term irreversible change known as climate commitment.

Earth's inertial responses are important because they provide the planet's diversity of life and its human civilization further time to adapt to an acceptable degree of planetary change. However, unadaptable change like that accompanying some tipping points may only be avoidable with early understanding and mitigation of the risk of such dangerous outcomes. This is because inertia also delays much surface warming unless and until action is taken to rapidly reduce emissions. An aim of Integrated assessment modelling, summarized for example as Shared Socioeconomic Pathways (SSP), is to explore Earth system risks that accompany large inertia and uncertainty in the trajectory of human drivers of change.

== Inertial timescales ==
Response times to climate forcing
Earth System Component	Time Constant (years)	Response Modes
Atmosphere		
Water Vapor and Clouds	10^{−2}-10	EC, WC
Trace Gases	10^{−1}-10^{8}	CC
Hydrosphere		
Ocean Mixed; Layer	10^{−1}-10	EC, WC, CC
Deep Ocean	10-10^{3}	EC, CC
Lithosphere		
Land Surface and Soils	10^{−1}-10^{2}	EC, WC, CC
Subterranean; Sediments	10^{4}-10^{9}	CC
Cryosphere		
Glaciers	10^{−1}-10	EC, WC
Sea Ice	10^{−1}-10	EC, WC
Ice Sheets	10^{3}-10^{6}	EC, WC
Biosphere		
Upper Marine	10^{−1}-10^{2}	CC
Terrestrial	10^{−1}-10^{2}	WC, CC
EC=Energy Cycle WC=Water Cycle CC=Carbon Cycle

The paleoclimate record shows that Earth's climate system has evolved along various pathways and with multiple timescales. Its relatively stable states which can persist for many millennia have been interrupted by short to long transitional periods of relative instability. Studies of climate sensitivity and inertia are concerned with quantifying the most basic manner in which a sustained forcing perturbation will cause the system to deviate within or initially away from its relatively stable state of the present Holocene epoch.

"Time constants" are useful metrics for summarizing the first-order (linear) impacts of the various inertial phenomena within both simple and complex systems. They quantify the time after which 63% of a full output response occurs following the step change of an input. They are observed from data or can be estimated from numerical simulation or a lumped system analysis. In climate science these methods can be applied to Earth's energy cycle, water cycle, carbon cycle and elsewhere. For example, heat transport and storage in the ocean, cryosphere, land and atmosphere are elements within a lumped thermal analysis. Response times to radiative forcing via the atmosphere typically increase with depth below the surface.

Inertial time constants indicate a base rate for forced changes, but lengthy values provide no guarantee of long-term system evolution along a smooth pathway. Numerous higher-order tipping elements having various trigger thresholds and transition timescales have been identified within Earth's present state. Such events might precipitate a nonlinear rearrangement of internal energy flows along with more rapid shifts in climate and/or other systems at regional to global scale.

=== Climate response time ===
The response of global surface temperature (GST) to a step-like doubling of the atmospheric CO_{2} concentration, and its resultant forcing, is defined as the Equilibrium Climate Sensitivity (ECS). The ECS response extends over short and long timescales, however the main time constant associated with ECS has been identified by Jule Charney, James Hansen and others as a useful metric to help guide policymaking. RCPs, SSPs, and other similar scenarios have also been used by researchers to simulate the rate of forced climate changes. By definition, ECS presumes that ongoing emissions will offset the ocean and land carbon sinks following the step-wise perturbation in atmospheric CO_{2}.

ECS response time is proportional to ECS and is principally regulated by the thermal inertia of the uppermost mixed layer and adjacent lower ocean layers. Main time constants fitted to the results from climate models have ranged from a few decades when ECS is low, to as long as a century when ECS is high. A portion of the variation between estimates arises from different treatments of heat transport into the deep ocean.

== Components ==
=== Thermal inertia ===
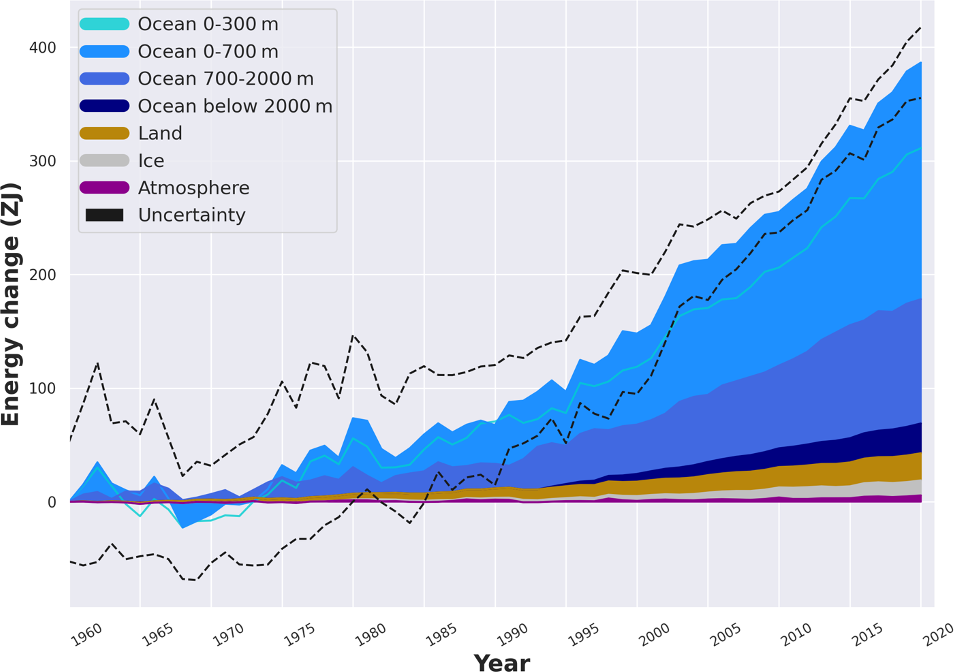
The observed accumulation of energy in the oceanic, land, ice, and atmospheric components of Earth's climate system since 1960. The rate of rise has been partially slowed by the system's thermal inertia.

Thermal inertia is a term which refers to the observed delays in a body's temperature response during heat transfers. A body with large thermal inertia can store a big amount of energy because of its heat capacity, and can effectively transmit energy according to its heat transfer coefficient. The consequences of thermal inertia are inherently expressed via many climate change feedbacks because of their temperature dependencies; including through the strong stabilizing feedback of the Planck response.

==== Ocean inertia ====
The global ocean is Earth's largest thermal reservoir that functions to regulate the planet's climate; acting as both a sink and a source of energy. The ocean's thermal inertia delays some global warming for decades or centuries. It is accounted for in global climate models, and has been confirmed via measurements of ocean heat content. The observed transient climate sensitivity is proportional to the thermal inertia time scale of the shallower ocean.

==== Ice sheet inertia ====
Even after CO_{2} emissions are lowered, the melting of ice sheets will persist and further increase sea-level rise for centuries. The slower transportation of heat into the extreme deep ocean, subsurface land sediments, and thick ice sheets will continue until the new Earth system equilibrium has been reached.

Permafrost also takes longer to respond to a warming planet because of thermal inertia, due to ice rich materials and permafrost thickness.

=== Inertia from carbon cycle feedbacks ===
The impulse response following a 100 GtC injection of CO_{2} into Earth's atmosphere. The relative inertial effect of positive vs. negative feedback during early years is indicated by the pulse fraction which ultimately remains.

Earth's carbon cycle feedback includes a destabilizing positive feedback (identified as the climate-carbon feedback) which prolongs warming for centuries, and a stabilizing negative feedback (identified as the concentration-carbon feedback) which limits the ultimate warming response to fossil carbon emissions. The near-term effect following emissions is asymmetric with latter mechanism being about four times larger, and results in a significant net slowing contribution to the inertia of the climate system during the first few decades following emissions.

=== Ecological inertia ===
Depending on the ecosystem, effects of climate change could show quickly, while others take more time to respond. For instance, coral bleaching can occur in a single warm season, while trees may be able to persist for decades under a changing climate, but be unable to regenerate. Changes in the frequency of extreme weather events could disrupt ecosystems as a consequence, depending on individual response times of species.

== Policy implications of inertia ==
The IPCC concluded that the inertia and uncertainty of the climate system, ecosystems, and socioeconomic systems implies that margins for safety should be considered. Thus, setting strategies, targets, and time tables for avoiding dangerous interference through climate change. Further the IPCC concluded in their 2001 report that the stabilization of atmospheric CO_{2} concentration, temperature, or sea level is affected by:

- The inertia of the climate system, which will cause climate change to continue for a period after mitigation actions are implemented.
- Uncertainty regarding the location of possible thresholds of irreversible change and the behavior of the system in their vicinity.
- The time lags between adoption of mitigation goals and their achievement.

== See also ==
- Earth's energy budget
- Planetary boundaries
- Systems theory and Systems analysis
