= Climate system =

Interactions that create Earth's climate

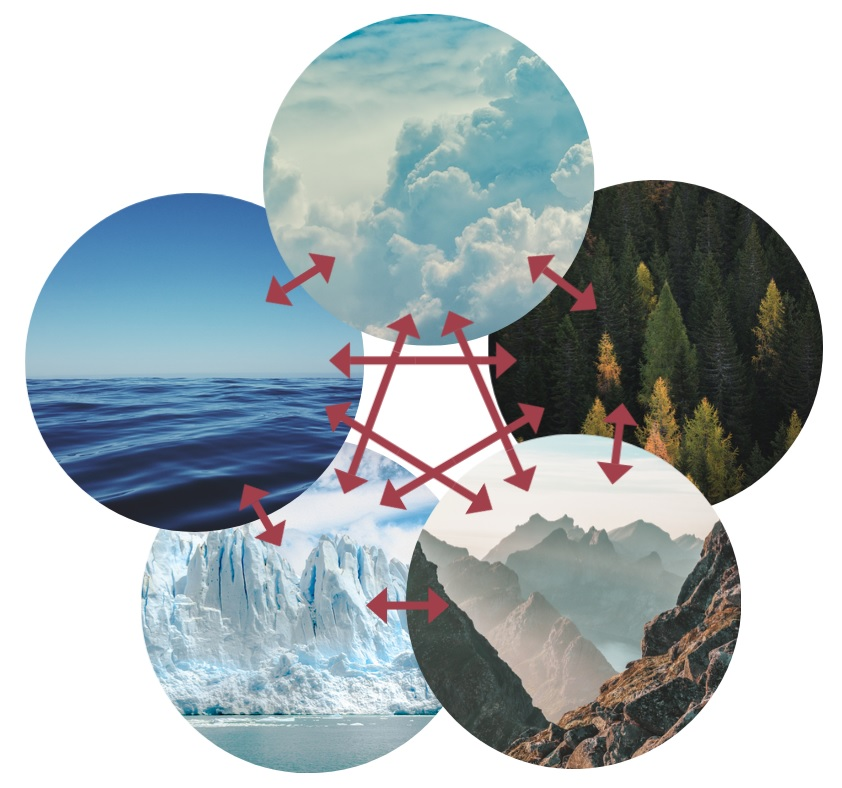
The five components of the climate system all interact. They are the atmosphere, the hydrosphere, the cryosphere, the lithosphere and the biosphere.

Earth's climate system is a complex system with five interacting components: the atmosphere (air), the hydrosphere (water), the cryosphere (ice and permafrost), the lithosphere (earth's upper rocky layer) and the biosphere (living things). Climate is the statistical characterization of the climate system. It represents the average weather, typically over a period of 30 years, and is determined by a combination of processes, such as ocean currents and wind patterns. Circulation in the atmosphere and oceans transports heat from the tropical regions to regions that receive less energy from the Sun. Solar radiation is the main driving force for this circulation. The water cycle also moves energy throughout the climate system. In addition, certain chemical elements are constantly moving between the components of the climate system. Two examples for these biochemical cycles are the carbon and nitrogen cycles.

The climate system can change due to internal variability and external forcings. These external forcings can be natural, such as variations in solar intensity and volcanic eruptions, or caused by humans. Accumulation of greenhouse gases in the atmosphere, mainly being emitted by people burning fossil fuels, is causing climate change. Human activity also releases cooling aerosols, but their net effect is far less than that of greenhouse gases. Changes can be amplified by feedback processes in the different climate system components.

== Components ==
The atmosphere envelops the earth and extends hundreds of kilometres from the surface. It consists mostly of inert nitrogen (78%), oxygen (21%) and argon (0.9%). Some trace gases in the atmosphere, such as water vapour and carbon dioxide, are the gases most important for the workings of the climate system, as they are greenhouse gases which allow visible light from the Sun to penetrate to the surface, but block some of the infrared radiation the Earth's surface emits to balance the Sun's radiation. This causes surface temperatures to rise.

The hydrological cycle is the movement of water through the climate system. Not only does the hydrological cycle determine patterns of precipitation, it also has an influence on the movement of energy throughout the climate system.

The hydrosphere proper contains all the liquid water on Earth, with most of it contained in the world's oceans. The ocean covers 71% of Earth's surface to an average depth of nearly 4 kilometres (2.5 miles), and ocean heat content is much larger than the heat held by the atmosphere. It contains seawater with a salt content of about 3.5% on average, but this varies spatially. Brackish water is found in estuaries and some lakes, and most freshwater, 2.5% of all water, is held in ice and snow.

The cryosphere contains all parts of the climate system where water is solid. This includes sea ice, ice sheets, permafrost and snow cover. Because there is more land in the Northern Hemisphere compared to the Southern Hemisphere, a larger part of that hemisphere is covered in snow. Both hemispheres have about the same amount of sea ice. Most frozen water is contained in the ice sheets on Greenland and Antarctica, which average about 2 kilometres (1.2 miles) in height. These ice sheets slowly flow towards their margins.

The Earth's crust, specifically mountains and valleys, shapes global wind patterns: vast mountain ranges form a barrier to winds and impact where and how much it rains. Land closer to open ocean has a more moderate climate than land farther from the ocean. For the purpose of modelling the climate, the land is often considered static as it changes very slowly compared to the other elements that make up the climate system. The position of the continents determines the geometry of the oceans and therefore influences patterns of ocean circulation. The locations of the seas are important in controlling the transfer of heat and moisture across the globe, and therefore, in determining global climate.

Lastly, the biosphere also interacts with the rest of the climate system. Vegetation is often darker or lighter than the soil beneath, so that more or less of the Sun's heat gets trapped in areas with vegetation. Vegetation is good at trapping water, which is then taken up by its roots. Without vegetation, this water would have run off to the closest rivers or other water bodies. Water taken up by plants instead evaporates, contributing to the hydrological cycle. Precipitation and temperature influences the distribution of different vegetation zones. Carbon assimilation from seawater by the growth of small phytoplankton is almost as much as land plants from the atmosphere. While humans are technically part of the biosphere, they are often treated as a separate components of Earth's climate system, the anthroposphere, because of human's large impact on the planet.

== Flows of energy, water and elements ==
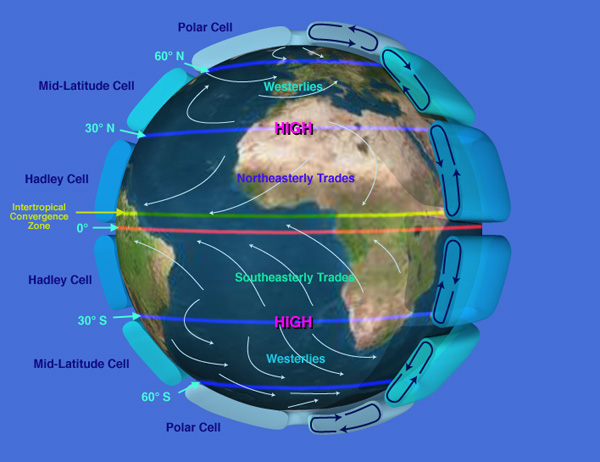
Earth's atmospheric circulation is driven by the energy imbalance between the equator and the poles. It is further influenced by the rotation of Earth around its own axis.

=== Energy and general circulation ===
The climate system receives energy from the Sun, and to a far lesser extent from the Earth's core, as well as tidal energy from the Moon. The Earth gives off energy to outer space in two forms: it directly reflects a part of the radiation of the Sun and it emits infra-red radiation as black-body radiation. The balance of incoming and outgoing energy, and the passage of the energy through the climate system, determines Earth's energy budget. When the total of incoming energy is greater than the outgoing energy, Earth's Energy Imbalance is positive and the climate system is warming. If more energy goes out, the energy imbalance is negative and Earth experiences cooling.

More energy reaches the tropics than the polar regions and the subsequent temperature difference drives the global circulation of the atmosphere and oceans. Air rises when it warms, flows polewards and sinks again when it cools, returning to the equator. Due to the conservation of angular momentum, the Earth's rotation diverts the air to the right in the Northern Hemisphere and to the left in the Southern hemisphere, thus forming distinct atmospheric cells. Monsoons, seasonal changes in wind and precipitation that occur mostly in the tropics, form due to the fact that land masses heat up more easily than the ocean. The temperature difference induces a pressure difference between land and ocean, driving a steady wind.

Ocean water that has more salt has a higher density and differences in density play an important role in ocean circulation. The thermohaline circulation transports heat from the tropics to the polar regions. Ocean circulation is further driven by the interaction with wind. The salt component also influences the freezing point temperature. Vertical movements can bring up colder water to the surface in a process called upwelling, which cools down the air above.

=== Hydrological cycle ===
The hydrological cycle or water cycle describes how it is constantly moved between the surface of the Earth and the atmosphere. Plants evapotranspirate and sunlight evaporates water from oceans and other water bodies, leaving behind salt and other minerals. The evaporated freshwater later rains back onto the surface. Precipitation and evaporation are not evenly distributed across the globe, with some regions such as the tropics having more rainfall than evaporation, and others having more evaporation than rainfall. The evaporation of water requires substantial quantities of energy, whereas a lot of heat is released during condensation. This latent heat is the primary source of energy in the atmosphere.

=== Biogeochemical cycles ===
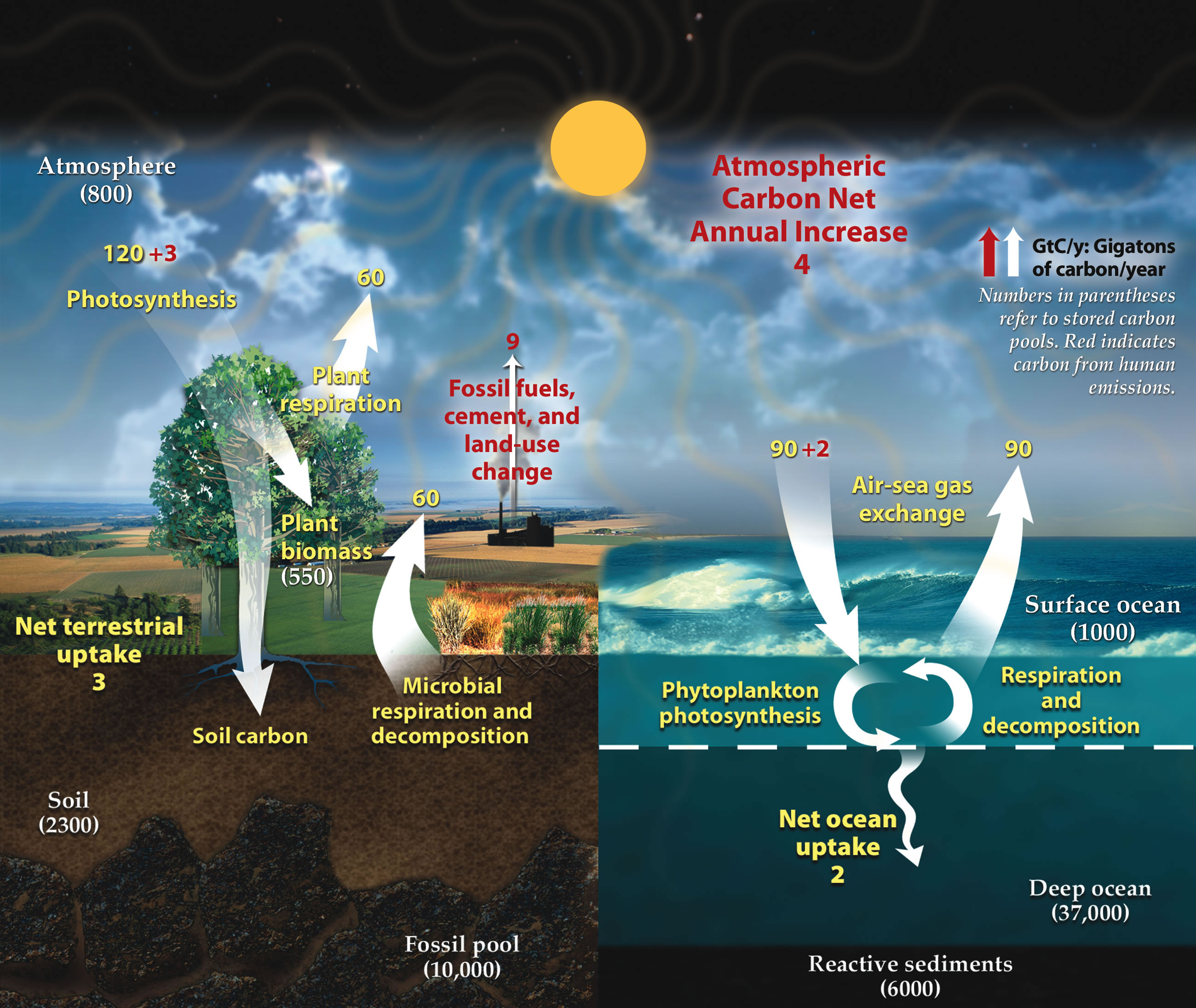
Carbon is constantly transported between the different elements of the climate system: fixed by living creatures and transported through the ocean and atmosphere.

Chemical elements, vital for life, are constantly cycled through the different components of the climate system. The carbon cycle is directly important for climate as it determines the concentrations of two important greenhouse gases in the atmosphere: CO_{2} and methane. In the fast part of the carbon cycle, plants take up carbon dioxide from the atmosphere using photosynthesis; this is later re-emitted by the breathing of living creatures. As part of the slow carbon cycle, volcanoes release CO_{2} by degassing, releasing carbon dioxide from the Earth's crust and mantle. As CO_{2} in the atmosphere makes rain a bit acidic, this rain can slowly dissolve some rocks, a process known as weathering. The minerals that are released in this way, transported to the sea, are used by living creatures whose remains can form sedimentary rocks, bringing the carbon back to the lithosphere.

The nitrogen cycle describes the flow of active nitrogen. As atmospheric nitrogen is inert, micro-organisms first have to convert this to an active nitrogen compound in a process called fixing nitrogen, before it can be used as a building block in the biosphere. Human activities play an important role in both carbon and nitrogen cycles: the burning of fossil fuels has displaced carbon from the lithosphere to the atmosphere, and the use of fertilizers has vastly increased the amount of available fixed nitrogen.

== Changes within the climate system ==
Climate is constantly varying, on timescales that range from seasons to the lifetime of the Earth. Changes caused by the system's own components and dynamics are called internal climate variability. The system can also experience external forcing from phenomena outside of the system (e.g. a change in Earth's orbit). Longer changes, usually defined as changes that persist for at least 30 years, are referred to as climate changes, although this phrase usually refers to the current global climate change. When the climate changes, the effects may build on each other, cascading through the other parts of the system in a series of climate feedbacks (e.g. albedo changes), producing many different effects (e.g. sea level rise).

=== Internal variability ===
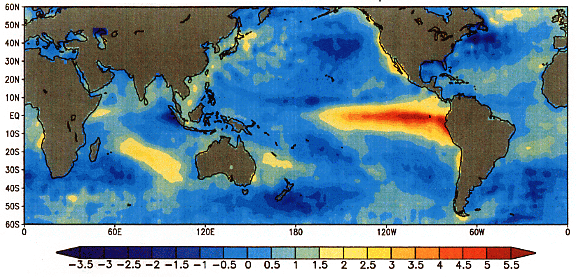
Difference between normal December sea surface temperature [°C] and temperatures during the strong El Niño of 1997. El Niño typically brings wetter weather to Mexico and the United States.

Components of the climate system vary continuously, even without external pushes (external forcing). One example in the atmosphere is the North Atlantic Oscillation (NAO), which operates as an atmospheric pressure see-saw. The Portuguese Azores typically have high pressure, whereas there is often lower pressure over Iceland. The difference in pressure oscillates and this affects weather patterns across the North Atlantic region up to central Eurasia. For instance, the weather in Greenland and Canada is cold and dry during a positive NAO. Different phases of the North Atlantic oscillation can be sustained for multiple decades.

The ocean and atmosphere can also work together to spontaneously generate internal climate variability that can persist for years to decades at a time. Examples of this type of variability include the El Niño–Southern Oscillation, the Pacific decadal oscillation, and the Atlantic Multidecadal Oscillation. These variations can affect global average surface temperature by redistributing heat between the deep ocean and the atmosphere; but also by altering the cloud, water vapour or sea ice distribution, which can affect the total energy budget of the earth.

The oceanic aspects of these oscillations can generate variability on centennial timescales due to the ocean having hundreds of times more mass than the atmosphere, and therefore larger heat capacity and thermal inertia. For example, alterations to ocean processes such as thermohaline circulation play a key role in redistributing heat in the world's oceans. Understanding internal variability helped scientists to attribute recent climate change to greenhouse gases.

=== External climate forcing ===
On long timescales, the climate is determined mainly by how much energy is in the system and where it goes. When the Earth's energy budget changes, the climate follows. A change in the energy budget is called a forcing. When the change is caused by something outside of the five components of the climate system, it is called an external forcing. Volcanoes, for example, result from deep processes within the earth that are not considered part of the climate system. Human actions, off-planet changes, such as solar variation and incoming asteroids, are also external to the climate system's five components.

The primary value to quantify and compare climate forcings is radiative forcing.

==== Incoming sunlight ====
The Sun is the predominant source of energy input to the Earth and drives atmospheric circulation. The amount of energy coming from the Sun varies on shorter time scales, including the 11-year solar cycle and longer-term time scales. While the solar cycle is too small to directly warm and cool Earth's surface, it does influence a higher layer of the atmosphere directly, the stratosphere, which may have an effect on the atmosphere near the surface.

Slight variations in the Earth's motion can cause large changes in the seasonal distribution of sunlight reaching the Earth's surface and how it is distributed across the globe, although not to the global and yearly average sunlight. The three types of kinematic change are variations in Earth's eccentricity, changes in the tilt angle of Earth's axis of rotation, and precession of Earth's axis. Together these produce Milankovitch cycles, which affect climate and are notable for their correlation to glacial and interglacial periods.

==== Greenhouse gases ====
Greenhouse gases trap heat in the lower part of the atmosphere by absorbing longwave radiation. In the Earth's past, many processes contributed to variations in greenhouse gas concentrations. Currently, emissions by humans are the cause of increasing concentrations of some greenhouse gases, such as CO_{2}, methane and N_{2}O. The dominant contributor to the greenhouse effect is water vapour (~50%), with clouds (~25%) and CO_{2} (~20%) also playing an important role. When concentrations of long-lived greenhouse gases such as CO_{2} are increased, temperature and water vapour increase. Accordingly, water vapour and clouds are not seen as external forcings but as feedback.

The weathering of carbonates and silicates removes carbon from the atmosphere.

==== Aerosols ====
Liquid and solid particles in the atmosphere, collectively named aerosols, have diverse effects on the climate. Some primarily scatter sunlight, cooling the planet, while others absorb sunlight and warm the atmosphere. Indirect effects include the fact that aerosols can act as cloud condensation nuclei, stimulating cloud formation. Natural sources of aerosols include sea spray, mineral dust, meteorites and volcanoes. Still, humans also contribute as a human activity, such as the combustion of biomass or fossil fuels, releases aerosols into the atmosphere. Aerosols counteract some of the warming effects of emitted greenhouse gases until they fall back to the surface in a few years or less.

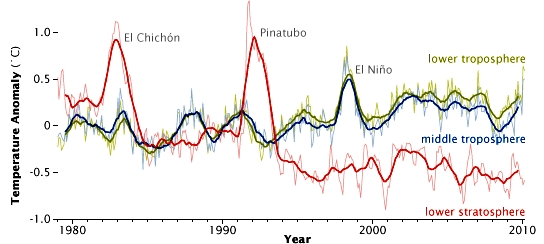
In atmospheric temperature from 1979 to 2010, determined by MSU NASA satellites, effects appear from aerosols released by major volcanic eruptions (El Chichón and Pinatubo). El Niño is a separate event from ocean variability.

Although volcanoes are technically part of the lithosphere, which is part of the climate system, volcanism is defined as an external forcing agent. On average, there are only several volcanic eruptions per century that influence Earth's climate for longer than a year by ejecting tons of SO_{2} into the stratosphere. The sulfur dioxide is chemically converted into aerosols that cause cooling by blocking a fraction of sunlight to the Earth's surface. Small eruptions affect the atmosphere only subtly.

==== Land use and cover change ====
Changes in land cover, such as change of water cover (e.g. rising sea level, drying up of lakes and outburst floods) or deforestation, particularly through human use of the land, can affect the climate. The reflectivity of the area can change, causing the region to capture more or less sunlight. In addition, vegetation interacts with the hydrological cycle, so precipitation is also affected. Landscape fires release greenhouse gases into the atmosphere and release black carbon, which darkens snow, making it easier to melt.

=== Responses and feedbacks ===
Some effects of global warming can either enhance (positive feedbacks) or inhibit (negative feedbacks) warming. Observations and modeling studies indicate that there is a net positive feedback to Earth's current global warming.

The different elements of the climate system respond to external forcing in different ways. One important difference between the components is the speed at which they react to a forcing. The atmosphere typically responds within a couple of hours to weeks, while the deep ocean and ice sheets take centuries to millennia to reach a new equilibrium.

The initial response of a component to an external forcing can be damped by negative feedbacks and enhanced by positive feedbacks. For example, a significant decrease of solar intensity would quickly lead to a temperature decrease on Earth, which would then allow ice and snow cover to expand. The extra snow and ice has a higher albedo or reflectivity, and therefore reflects more of the Sun's radiation back into space before it can be absorbed by the climate system as a whole; this in turn causes the Earth to cool down further.
