= Pan Inuit Trails Atlas =

- Housed at: Online
- Funded by: Social Sciences and Humanities Research Council
- Website: paninuittrails.org

The Pan Inuit Trails Atlas is an interactive database that depicts traditional place names and routes used by the Inuit in the Canadian Arctic, showing connections between Inuit communities from Greenland to Alaska, focusing on the eastern Canadian arctic region. The database is a geospatially-organized collection of material drawn from published and unpublished sources held in public libraries and archives throughout Canada.

== History ==
The atlas was created from 1999 to 2014 by a team consisting of individuals from the Cartographic Research Centre at Carleton University, the Marine Affairs Program at Dalhousie University, and the Scott Polar Research Institute at Cambridge University. The research was co-directed by Claudio Aporta (Dalhousie University), Michael Bravo (Cambridge University), and Fraser Taylor (Carleton University). The atlas was featured in the 2014 documentary The Polar Sea. Funding was procured from the Canadian federal research-funding agency Social Sciences and Humanities Research Council.

== Description ==
The atlas documents the historical and present communities established and the land, sea, and ice routes travelled. It also contains information about geographical features. The maps are published on a dedicated website using Google Maps, with each marked feature accompanied by anecdotes and other details. These are intended as an educational resource, not a navigational aid. Taylor states that more research is necessary to document other regions, including Labrador, Arctic Quebec, and the western Canadian Arctic. The creators hope to expand the atlas with information about the Inupiat, Inuvialuit, and peoples of Nunatsiavut and Nunavik.

The network of trails and routes were often created for hunting, and were seasonal based on animal migration, including open water routes in the summer and ice routes in the winter. Others were used for trade and communication. Trails depicted include those travelled by foot, sled, and boat, many of which are still used today.

Sources used to create the maps include the lore of Inuit elders, maps from the nineteenth and twentieth centuries, and unpublished documents from explorers, ethnographers, and visitors preceding the Inuit resettlement of the early twentieth century. The source maps from which information was culled are published on the Pan Inuit Trails Atlas website.

The maps also provide an additional point of argument for the Government of Canada to claim that the Northwest Passage through the Canadian Arctic Archipelago is part of the Canadian Internal Waters and thus under Canadian sovereignty. The maps document Inuit place names that "extend from the land onto the sea ice", and previous rulings by the International Court of Justice state that indigenous groups possess rights to areas they have traditionally occupied.

Some of the traditional trails have been modified recently with "deviations or detours from original routes" to mitigate sea ice forming later in the autumn or breaking up earlier in the spring as a result of climate change in the Arctic.
