= Jennifer Francis =

American scientist

Jennifer A. Francis
- Born: Marion, Massachusetts
- Education: University of Washington, San Jose State University, University of New Hampshire, Durham
- Spouse: Peter Francis
- Children: Holly, Tucker
- Scientific career
- Fields: Atmospheric sciences, Climate change in the Arctic
- Thesis: Arctic process and climate studies with the TOVS satellite sounder (1994)
- Doctoral advisor: Drew A. Rothrock

Jennifer Ann Francis is an American atmospheric scientist. She became a senior scientist at Woods Hole Research Center in 2018, after being a research professor at Rutgers University's Institute of Marine and Coastal Sciences starting in 1994.

== Education ==
Francis received a B.S. in meteorology from San Jose State University in 1988 and a PhD in atmospheric sciences from the University of Washington in 1994.

== Career ==
From 1987 to 1988, she was a research assistant at the Ames Research Center. From 1988 to 1994, while attending the University of Washington, she was a research assistant at the department of Polar Science Center there. From 1994 through 2018 she was a research professor at Rutgers University's School of Environmental and Biological Sciences's Institute of Marine and Coastal Sciences in North Brunswick, New Jersey. On October 18, 2018, she joined the staff of Woods Hole Research Center, in Falmouth, Massachusetts as a senior scientist.

== Research ==
Francis's research focuses on climate change in the Arctic, and has published over 40 scientific papers on the topic. It is also her opinion that warming in the Arctic may be changing the jet stream, which, in turn, may be leading to abnormal weather patterns such as an unusually long winter in the United Kingdom, the 2013 Colorado floods, and the unusually cold conditions across much of the southern United States in early 2014. Specifically, Francis argues that the heating and cooling of Arctic seawater (the Arctic is warming much faster than the rest of the world) has slowed down the jet stream, resulting in weather conditions persisting for longer than they usually would. That the warming in the Arctic is linked to extreme weather elsewhere in the world is a view supported by some of Francis's research, such as a study published in Geophysical Research Letters in 2012.

== Science Communication and Outreach ==
Francis has spoken and written regularly about her work, and the impacts of climate change. She has given interviews on the topics of rapid Arctic melt, the effects of a warming Arctic on the jet stream and weather patterns, the polar vortex, and the influence of polar-ice-cap melt on hurricanes, among many others. She has also given witness testimony on science before Congress, including testimony at a 2019 congressional hearing for the House Committee on Science, Space, and Technology in Washington DC, "The State of Climate Science and Why it Matters." Francis was featured in the 2020 documentary film The Last House Standing currently airing on public television stations in the United States. In the film she discusses how climate change and global warming are changing weather patterns in this country leading to an increase in disaster damage, late season strong hurricanes, damaging wildfires and tornadoes.

== Personal ==
Francis was born and raised in Marion, Massachusetts, as was her husband Peter. Between 1980 and 1985 they circumnavigated the world, including the Arctic, by sail. They have two children, Holly and Tucker with whom they spent a year sailing in Central America in 2009 and 2010.
