= Climate and vegetation interactions in the Arctic =

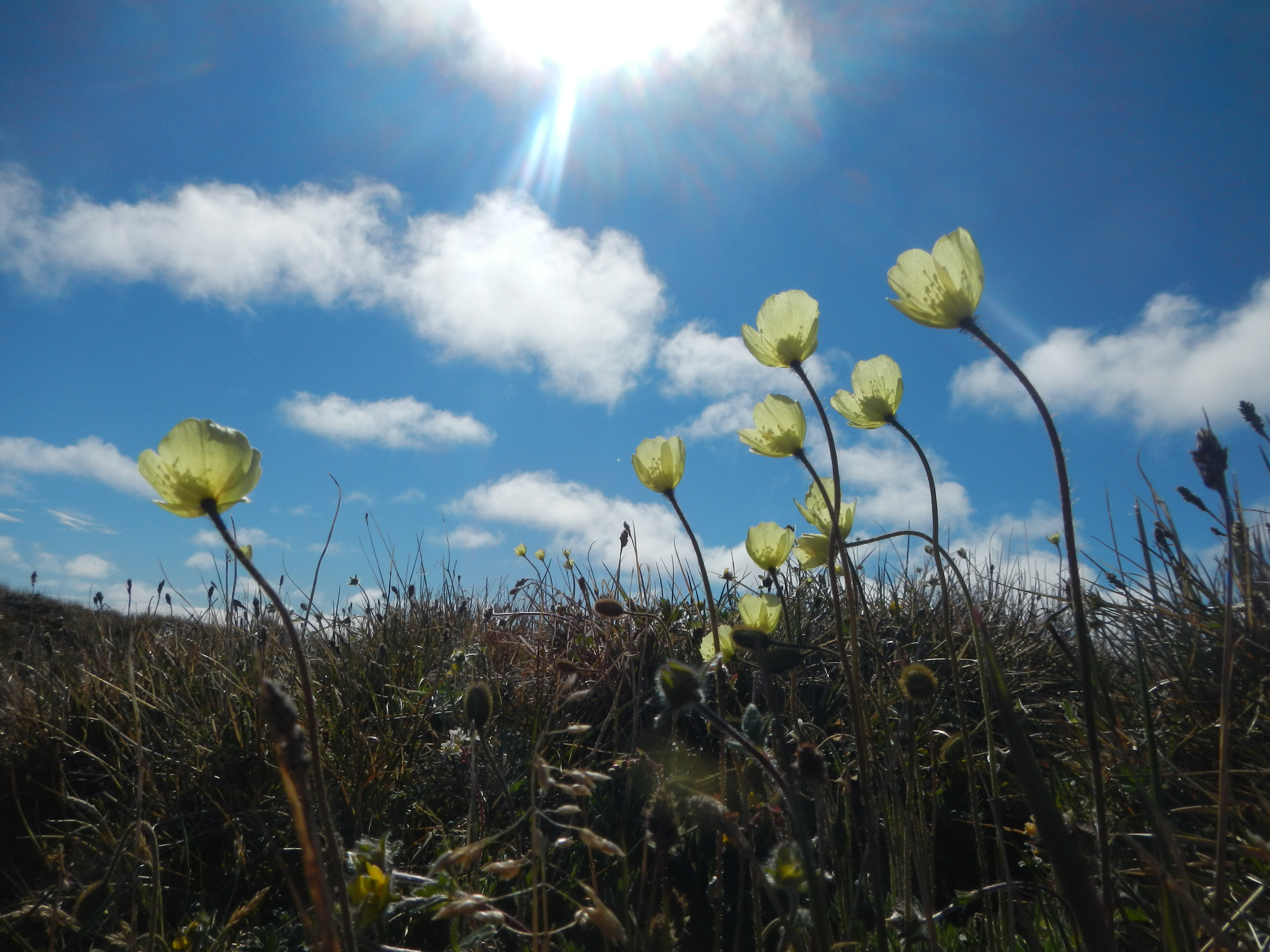
Papaver radicatum (arctic poppy), a flowering plant of the Arctic tundra follows the sun around the sky during the 24-hour daylight of summer north of the Arctic Circle.

Changing climate conditions are amplified in polar regions and northern high-latitude areas are projected to warm at twice the rate of the global average. These modifications result in ecosystem interactions and feedback that can augment or mitigate climatic changes. These interactions may have been important through the large climate fluctuations since the glacial period (the last ca. 14,500 years). Therefore, it is useful to review the past dynamics of vegetation and climate to place recent observed changes in the Arctic into context. This article focuses on northern Alaska where there has been much research on this theme.

== Recent changes ==
As the Arctic warms, large shifts are projected to occur throughout the Boreal-Arctic transition zone as tall-statured woody vegetation advances northward into tundra ecosystems. The onset of this shift has been documented through historical imagery, remote sensing, field observations, experimental manipulations, and placed in context with paleoecological data. In particular, shrub expansion in tundra ecosystems manifests through advancing shrub line (colonization), increasing density (infill), and growth of individuals (emergence). These processes are expected to exacerbate permafrost thaw, thereby facilitating decomposition of the Arctic's vast carbon stocks and increasing greenhouse gas emissions. Studies link increased shrub cover with tundra fire events, suggesting a potential mechanism for expansion through disturbance, but the factors that control the recruitment of new individuals are not well understood. Understanding the processes that enable shrub expansion is crucial to defining climate feedbacks, improving Earth System Models, and projecting future changes in tundra ecosystems.

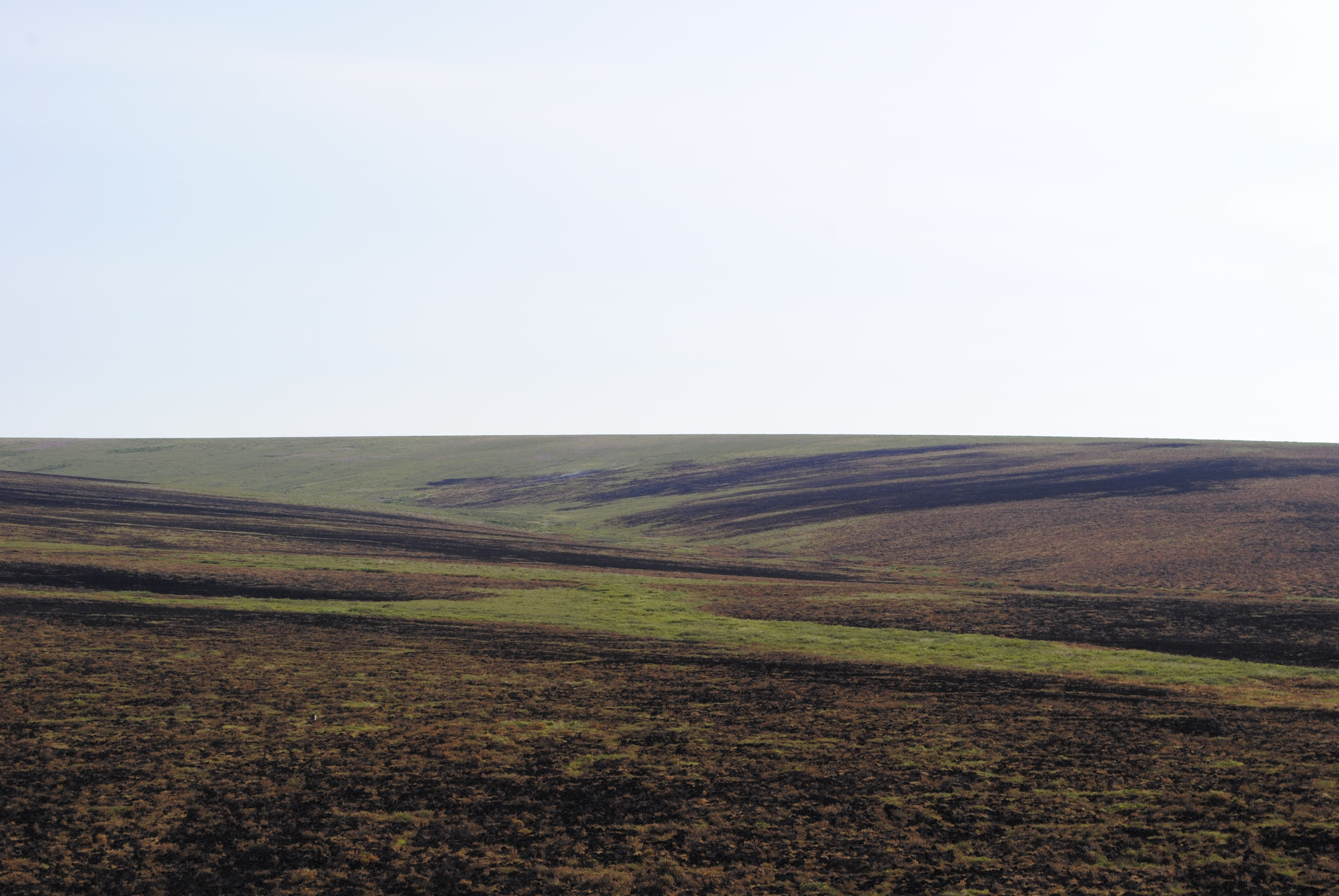
Tundra fire scar, July 2015: Mingvk Lake Fire, Quartz Creek, Seward Peninsula, AK. Photo was taken less than one month after fire.

Climate-vegetation interactions associated with shrub expansion in Arctic tundra ecosystems
Positive feedbacks	Negative feedbacks	Landscape changes
Permafrost thaw due to drifting snow; Decreased surface albedo; Increased evapotranspiration; Increased nitrogen mineralization; Increased fire frequency and intensity	Reduced summer soil temperature due to shading; Increased biomass	Amplified species turnover; Decreased abundance of moss and lichen; Migration of boreal species (such as moose and beaver)

== Past climate change ==
Shifting vegetation assemblages and fire regimes in the Arctic are of current research priority because of the strength of feedback with the global climate system, however, instrumental and historical observations are of limited duration and extent. Consequently, our ability to infer the potential magnitude and direction of change that this region may experience as a result of future climatic changes is hindered. However, a close analysis of Late Quaternary dynamics throughout this region can enhance our understanding of biotic responses to shifts in climate by providing insight as to how past ecosystems in this area were modified by a variety of environmental conditions. Since the climate of the historical record has only demonstrated a fraction of the natural variability seen throughout earth's history (or even that of the Quaternary period), this work will augment contemporary research into the dynamics of climate-induced vegetation change.

=== Quaternary climate change in arctic Alaska ===
==== Pleistocene (2.58 ma – 11.7 ka) ====
The Pleistocene epoch was characterized by frequent large swings in climate, which dramatically impacted ecosystem structure and function, especially in the Arctic. While global temperatures were below the present average for much of this epoch, significantly warmer periods did occur. For example, it is thought that during the last interglacial stage (from 130-116 ka) temperatures rose to 4 °C above present as result of increased insolation values during boreal summer (11% higher than present), which resulted in below-current ice extent and tree line advancement to approximately 600km north of the modern limit. Later on the climate was drastically colder (5-6 °C lower than the current global average between 25 and 21 ka) in the midst of the Last Glacial Maximum (LGM), which resulted in widespread northern hemispheric glaciation and a decrease in sea level of approximately 125 meters. During this time Beringia remained unglaciated as a result of it becoming significantly drier because of the shift towards a more interior continental regime caused by increased exposure of land mass as sea level decreased. This resulted in an Arctic landscape that is thought to have been much colder, drier, and windier than present which subsequently caused a significant southward retreat of tree line. The warming at the end of the LGM subsequently lead to the transition from the Pleistocene into the Holocene, a period of reduced climatic variability in relation to the preceding epoch.

==== Holocene (11.7 – 4.2 ka) ====
Throughout the early Holocene the Earth's climate continued to experience fluctuations, however over time the magnitude lessened, and the overall variation was reduced in comparison to the dramatic changes of the previous epoch. Following retreat of the northern hemisphere ice sheets that had expanded during the LGM the temperature and moisture conditions of eastern Beringia (northwestern Alaska) continued to fluctuate until reaching a middle Holocene thermal maximum from 7-5 ka where temperatures were 0.5-2 °C warmer than the most recent millennium. Following this warm period, temperatures began to decrease around 4-3 ka leading to the onset of Neoglacial cooling as high insolation levels began to decrease. The timing of the middle Holocene thermal maximum was significantly later than originally inferred (it had previously been suggested that this warm period began during the early Holocene 11.0-9. Ka), however multiproxy analysis has demonstrated that there was not a uniform thermal maximum throughout northwestern Alaska at that point.

== Past ecosystem change ==
=== Quaternary environmental change in Arctic Alaska ===
==== Pleistocene ====
Tundra ecosystems developed in the Northern Hemisphere toward the end of the Pliocene (3.6 ma), prior to this point the Arctic was predominantly covered with forests and shrublands which extended northward to the coastline of the Arctic Ocean. However, during the middle Pleistocene this vegetation pattern shifted to a graminoid tundra steppe. This transition away from taller-statured vegetation continued further until reaching an extreme during the Last Glacial Maximum, when forests did not reach north of 55°N except for areas where cryptic refugia occurred within Beringia. Likely due to the aridity (and resultant lack of snow cover) throughout the unglaciated region at this time shrub tundra was highly limited in extent in comparison to prior ecosystems. Instead, across Beringia graminoid tundra steppe formed a mosaic with prostrate dwarf shrub, and graminoid forb tundra (an ecotype that is currently restricted today). Representative of the large magnitude climatic changes occurring throughout this time, the vegetation patterns of the Pleistocene demonstrate large expansions and contractions of various ecosystems.

==== Holocene ====
During the dramatic landscape transition occurring throughout Beringia from the Pleistocene LGM into the early Holocene the arid tundra was replaced as shrubs expanded in warmer and wetter periods, eventually creating the mosaic of peatlands, boreal forest, and thaw lakes that characterizes the region today. During this time the boreal forest again advanced northward as beavers and trees (spruce, birch, and poplar) expanded on the Seward Peninsula, eventually expanding beyond even the 20th century extent of these species. However, the onset of neoglacial cooling after the Holocene climatic optimum restricted these species to their present distribution as relatively cool climatic conditions likely limited reproduction of taller stature vegetation. At the beginning stages of the transition from the LGM into the middle Holocene thermal maximum the landscape continued to transform as peatland and thaw lakes formed at high rate. However, these changes reached a peak between 11 and 10 ka prior to decreasing throughout the early Holocene as changing seasonality rather than temperature alone modified landscape processes and vegetation shifts. Shifting range limits and plant assemblages were further impacted by soil type, as a result vegetation change was not controlled by climatic conditions alone.

=== Spatiotemporal variability ===
During the dramatic transformations that occurred globally throughout the late Pleistocene, the area of Beringia experienced relatively minor changes in vegetation in comparison to other parts of the world as the tundra steppe persisted in spite of cold and dry conditions. This is likely a result of the extreme climatic pressures exerted upon vegetation throughout this region which limits species composition to a mosaic of assemblages which are collectively adapted for cold, arid, and disturbed environments. Following deglaciation the northward advance of tree line did not occur equally throughout the circumpolar region as the largest magnitude shift occurred in central Siberia while changes in North America were less significant, suggesting differential changes in summer warmth and seasonality. As a result of the complex interactions that shape fluctuating climate and vegetation dynamics it is important to consider both the nature of the changes as well as the evidence used to interpret them. This is a relevant topic for modern and historical scientific inquiry across fields but is especially important for paleoecological reconstructions of biotic response to climatic change.

== See also ==
Climate change in the Arctic
