= Climate change in the Arctic =

Impacts of climate change on the Arctic

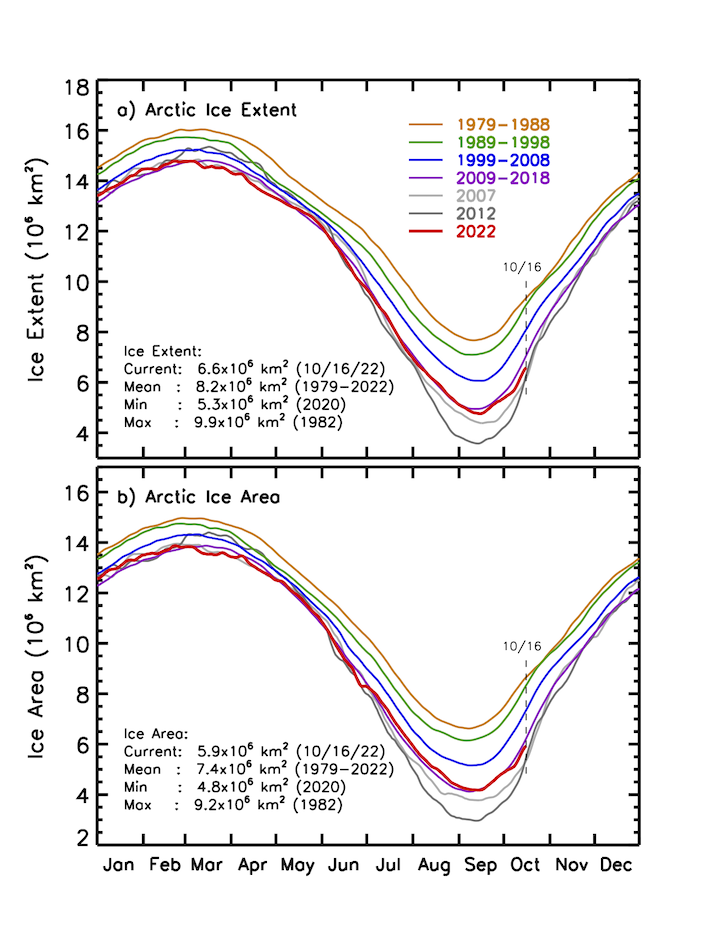
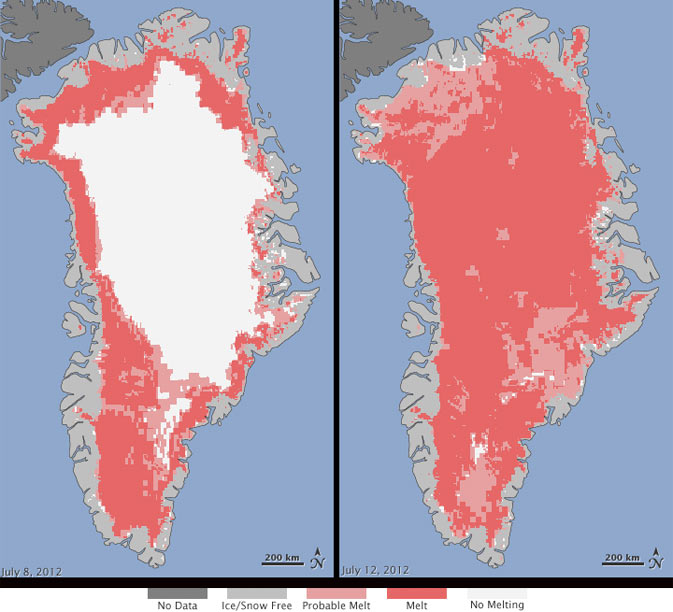
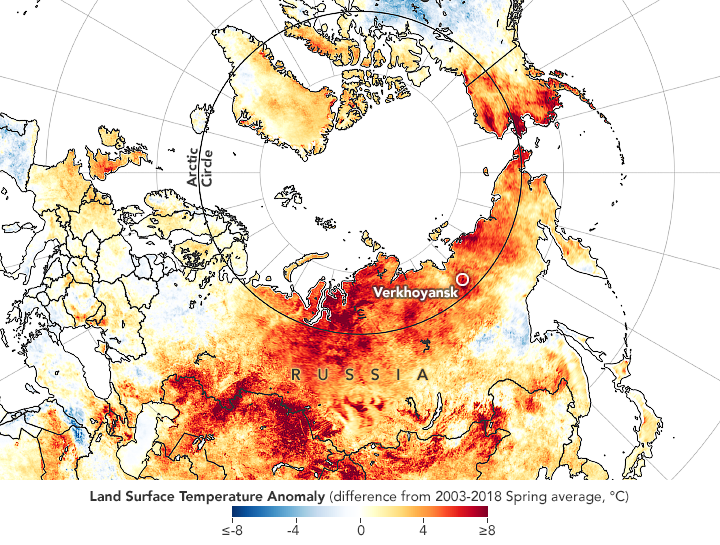
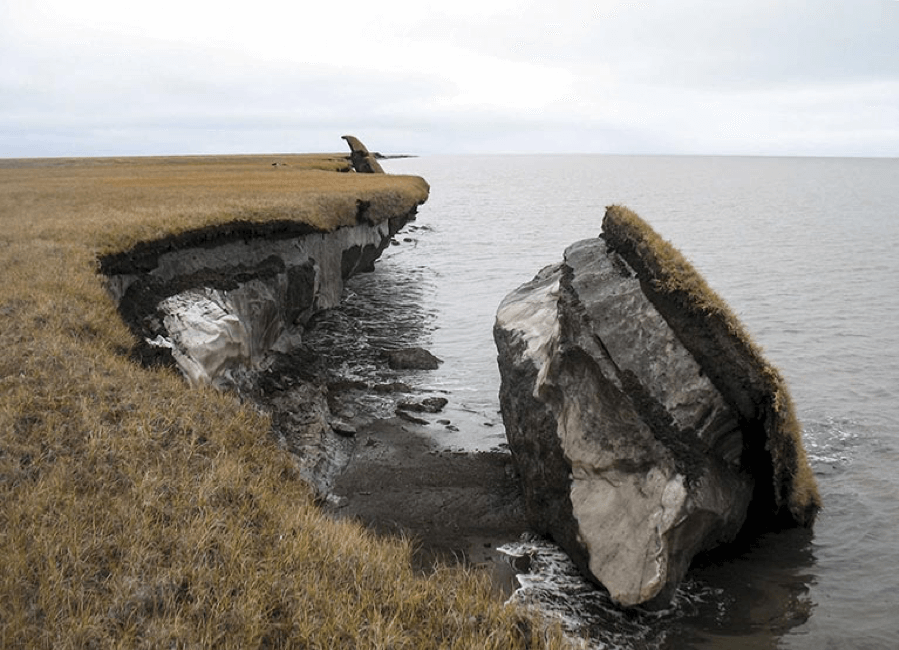
Arctic sea ice extent and area have declined every decade since the start of satellite observations in 1979: Greenland ice sheet had experienced a "massive melting event" in 2012, which reoccurred in 2019 and 2021; Satellite image of the extremely anomalous 2020 Siberian heatwave; Permafrost thaw is leading to severe erosion, like in this coastal location in Alaska

Due to climate change in the Arctic, this polar region is expected to become "profoundly different" by 2050. The speed of change is "among the highest in the world", with warming occurring at 3-4 times faster than the global average. This warming has already resulted in the profound Arctic sea ice decline, the accelerating melting of the Greenland ice sheet and the thawing of the permafrost landscape. These ongoing transformations are expected to be irreversible for centuries or even millennia.

Natural life in the Arctic is affected greatly. As the tundra warms, its soil becomes more hospitable to earthworms and larger plants, and the boreal forests spread to the north - yet this also makes the landscape more prone to wildfires, which take longer to recover from than in the other regions. Beavers also take advantage of this warming to colonize the Arctic rivers, and their dams contributing to methane emissions due to the increase in stagnant waters. The Arctic Ocean has experienced a large increase in the marine primary production as warmer waters and less shade from sea ice benefit phytoplankton. At the same time, it is already less alkaline than the rest of the global ocean, so ocean acidification caused by the increasing CO_{2} concentrations is more severe, threatening some forms of zooplankton such as pteropods.

The Arctic Ocean is expected to see its first ice-free events in the near future - most likely before 2050, and potentially in the late 2020s or early 2030s. This would have no precedent in the last 700,000 years. Some sea ice regrows every Arctic winter, but such events are expected to occur more and more frequently as the warming increases. This has great implications for the fauna species which are dependent on sea ice, such as polar bears. For humans, trade routes across the ocean will become more convenient. Yet, multiple countries have infrastructure in the Arctic which is worth billions of dollars, and it is threatened with collapse as the underlying permafrost thaws. The Arctic's indigenous people have a long relationship with its icy conditions, and face the loss of their cultural heritage.

Further, there are numerous implications which go beyond the Arctic region. Sea ice loss not only enhances warming in the Arctic but also adds to global temperature increase through the ice-albedo feedback. Permafrost thaw results in emissions of CO_{2} and methane that are comparable to those of major countries. Greenland melting is a significant contributor to global sea level rise. If the warming exceeds - or thereabouts, there is a significant risk of the entire ice sheet being lost over an estimated 10,000 years, adding up to global sea levels. Warming in the Arctic may affect the stability of the jet stream, and thus the extreme weather events in midlatitude regions, but there is only "low confidence" in that hypothesis.

== Impacts on the physical environment ==
=== Warming ===
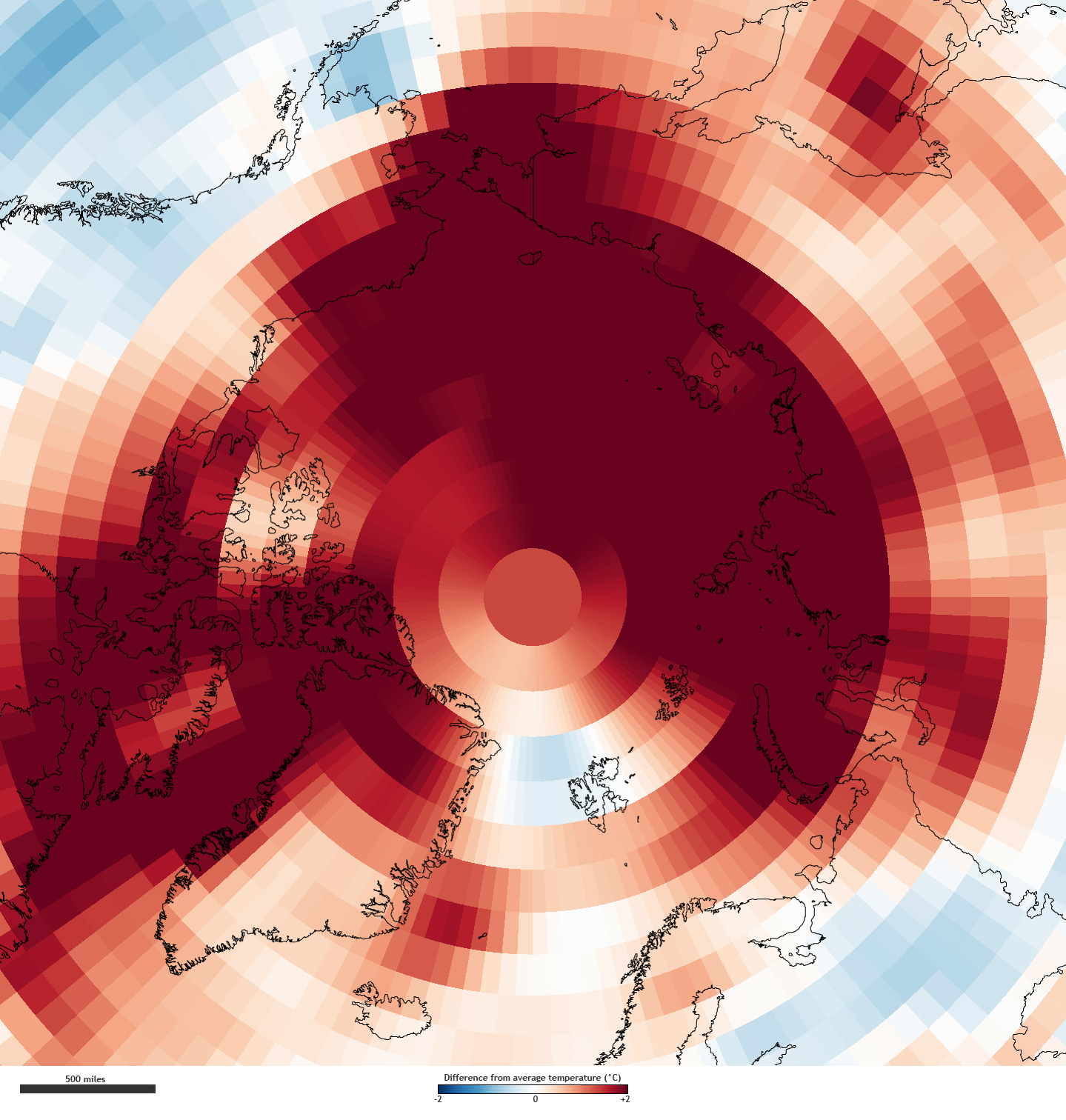
The image above shows where average air temperatures (October 2010 – September 2011) were up to 2 degrees Celsius above (red) or below (blue) the long-term average (1981–2010).

The period of 1995–2005 was the warmest decade in the Arctic since at least the 17th century, with temperatures 2 °C (3.6 °F) above the 1951–1990 average. Alaska and western Canada's temperature rose by 3 to 4 °C (5.40 to 7.20 °F) during that period. 2013 research has shown that temperatures in the region haven't been as high as they currently are since at least 44,000 years ago and perhaps as long as 120,000 years ago. Since 2013, Arctic annual mean surface air temperature (SAT) has been at least 1 °C (1.8 °F) warmer than the 1981-2010 mean.

In 2016, there were extreme anomalies from January to February with the temperature in the Arctic being estimated to be between 4–5.8 °C (7.2–10.4 °F) more than it was between 1981 and 2010. In 2020, mean SAT was 1.9 °C (3.4 °F) warmer than the 1981–2010 average. On 20 June 2020, for the first time, a temperature measurement was made inside the Arctic Circle of 38 °C, more than 100 °F. This kind of weather was expected in the region only by 2100. In March, April and May the average temperature in the Arctic was 10 °C (18.0 °F) higher than normal. This heat wave, without human – induced warming, could happen only one time in 80,000 years, according to an attribution study published in July 2020. It is the strongest link of a weather event to anthropogenic climate change that had been ever found, for now.

==== Arctic amplification ====
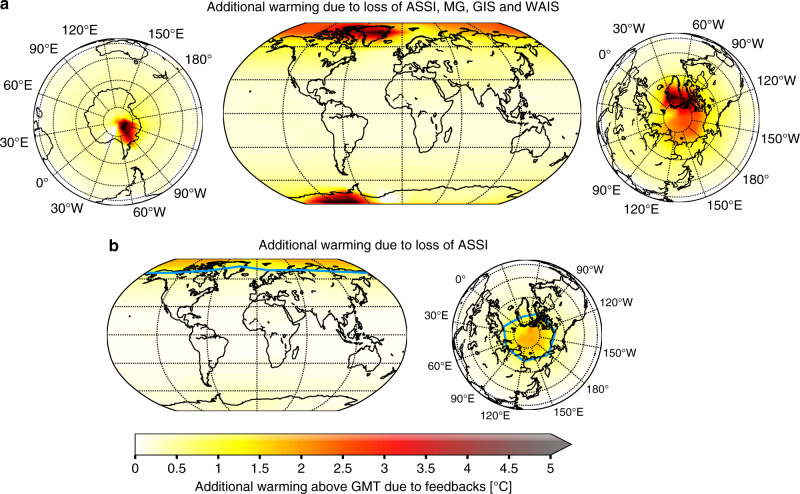
Potential regional warming caused by the loss of all land ice outside of East Antarctica, and by the disappearance of Arctic sea ice every year starting from June. While plausible, consistent sea ice loss would likely require relatively high warming, and the loss of all ice in Greenland would require multiple millennia.

Snow– and ice–albedo feedback have a substantial effect on regional temperatures. In particular, the presence of ice cover and sea ice makes the North Pole and the South Pole colder than they would have been without it. Consequently, recent Arctic sea ice decline is one of the primary factors behind the Arctic warming nearly four times faster than the global average since 1979 (the year when continuous satellite readings of the Arctic sea ice began), in a phenomenon known as Arctic amplification.

Modelling studies show that strong Arctic amplification only occurs during the months when significant sea ice loss occurs, and that it largely disappears when the simulated ice cover is held fixed. Conversely, the high stability of ice cover in Antarctica, where the thickness of the East Antarctic ice sheet allows it to rise nearly 4 km above the sea level, means that this continent has experienced very little net warming over the past seven decades, most of which was concentrated in West Antarctica. Ice loss in the Antarctic and its contribution to sea level rise is instead driven overwhelmingly by the warming of the Southern Ocean, which absorbed 35–43% of the total heat taken up by all oceans between 1970 and 2017.

Ice–albedo feedback also has a smaller, but still notable effect on the global temperatures. Arctic sea ice decline between 1979 and 2011 is estimated to have been responsible for 0.21 watts per square meter (W/m^{2}) of radiative forcing, which is equivalent to a quarter of radiative forcing from CO_{2} increases over the same period. When compared to cumulative increases in greenhouse gas radiative forcing since the start of the Industrial Revolution, it is equivalent to the estimated 2019 radiative forcing from nitrous oxide (0.21 W/m^{2}), nearly half of 2019 radiative forcing from methane (0.54 W/m^{2}) and 10% of the cumulative CO_{2} increase (2.16 W/m^{2}). Between 1992 and 2015, this effect was partly offset by the growth in sea ice cover around Antarctica, which produced cooling of about 0.06 W/m^{2} per decade. However, Antarctic sea ice had also begun to decline afterwards, and the combined role of changes in ice cover between 1992 and 2018 is equivalent to 10% of all the anthropogenic greenhouse gas emissions.

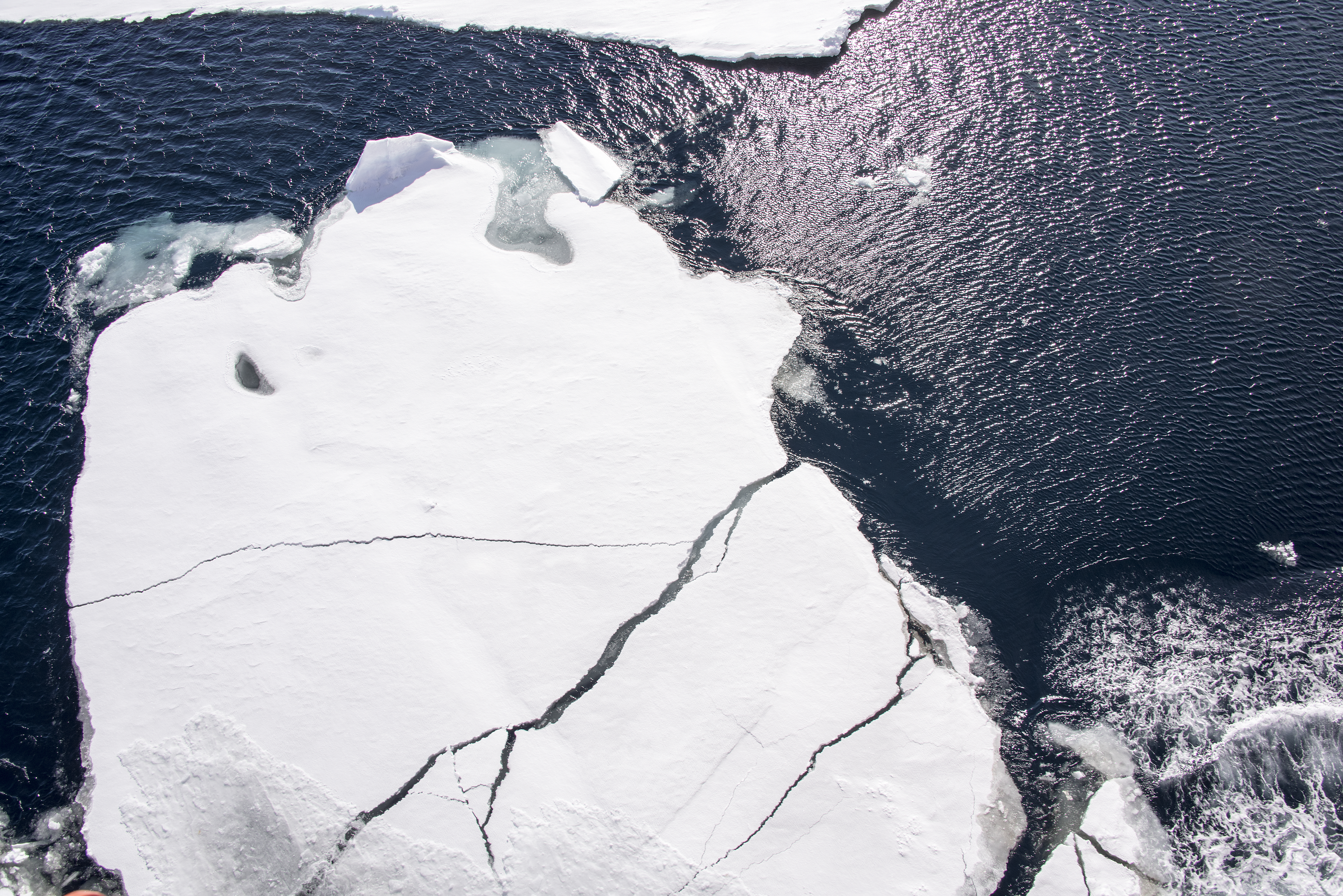
The dark ocean surface reflects only 6 percent of incoming solar radiation, while sea ice reflects 50 to 70 percent.

The Arctic was historically described as warming twice as fast as the global average, but this estimate was based on older observations which missed the more recent acceleration. By 2021, enough data was available to show that the Arctic had warmed three times as fast as the globe - 3.1°C between 1971 and 2019, as opposed to the global warming of 1°C over the same period. Moreover, this estimate defines the Arctic as everything above 60th parallel north, or a full third of the Northern Hemisphere: in 2021–2022, it was found that since 1979, the warming within the Arctic Circle itself (above the 66th parallel) has been nearly four times faster than the global average. Within the Arctic Circle itself, even greater Arctic amplification occurs in the Barents Sea area, with hotspots around West Spitsbergen Current: weather stations located on its path record decadal warming up to seven times faster than the global average. This has fuelled concerns that unlike the rest of the Arctic sea ice, ice cover in the Barents Sea may permanently disappear even around 1.5 degrees of global warming.

The acceleration of Arctic amplification has not been linear: a 2022 analysis found that it occurred in two sharp steps, with the former around 1986, and the latter after 2000. The first acceleration is attributed to the increase in anthropogenic radiative forcing in the region, which is in turn likely connected to the reductions in stratospheric sulfur aerosols pollution in Europe in the 1980s in order to combat acid rain. Since sulphate aerosols have a cooling effect, their absence is likely to have increased Arctic temperatures by up to 0.5 degrees Celsius. The second acceleration has no known cause, which is why it did not show up in any climate models. It is likely to be an example of multi-decadal natural variability, like the suggested link between Arctic temperatures and Atlantic Multi-decadal Oscillation (AMO), in which case it can be expected to reverse in the future. However, even the first increase in Arctic amplification was only accurately simulated by a fraction of the current CMIP6 models. Recent studies show the Arctic has warmed nearly four times faster than the global average since 1979, with areas like the Barents Sea experiencing rates up to seven times higher, highlighting the urgent need to address polar climate change.

=== Precipitation ===
Field studies in northwest Greenland have shown that increased summer rainfall can trigger large debris flows and slope failures in permafrost terrain. In 2016–2017, unprecedented rain events near Siorapaluk caused widespread mass movement processes that reshaped the landscape and damaged archaeological sites. Approximately a quarter of the surveyed archaeological landscape was affected, providing an indicator of long-term slope stability since the late Holocene and highlighting how shifts toward rain-dominated precipitation regimes are already altering Arctic geomorphology.

An observed impact of climate change is a strong increase in the number of lightnings in the Arctic. Lightnings increase the risk for wildfires. Some research suggests that globally, a warming greater than 1.5 °C (2.7 °F) over the preindustrial level could change the type of precipitation in the Arctic from snow to rain in summer and autumn.

=== Cryosphere loss ===
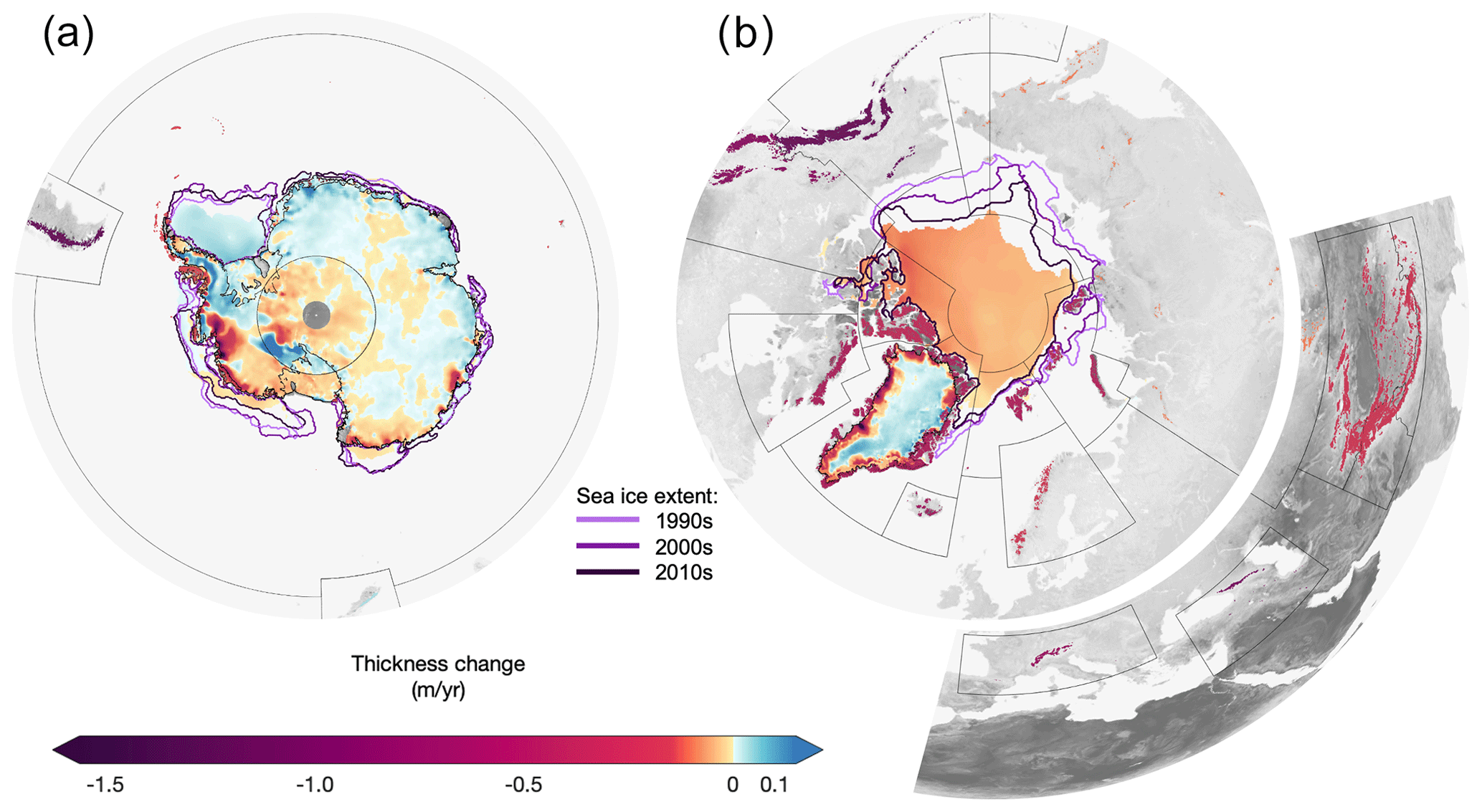
On average, climate change has lowered the thickness of land ice with every year, and reduced the extent of sea ice cover.

==== Sea ice ====
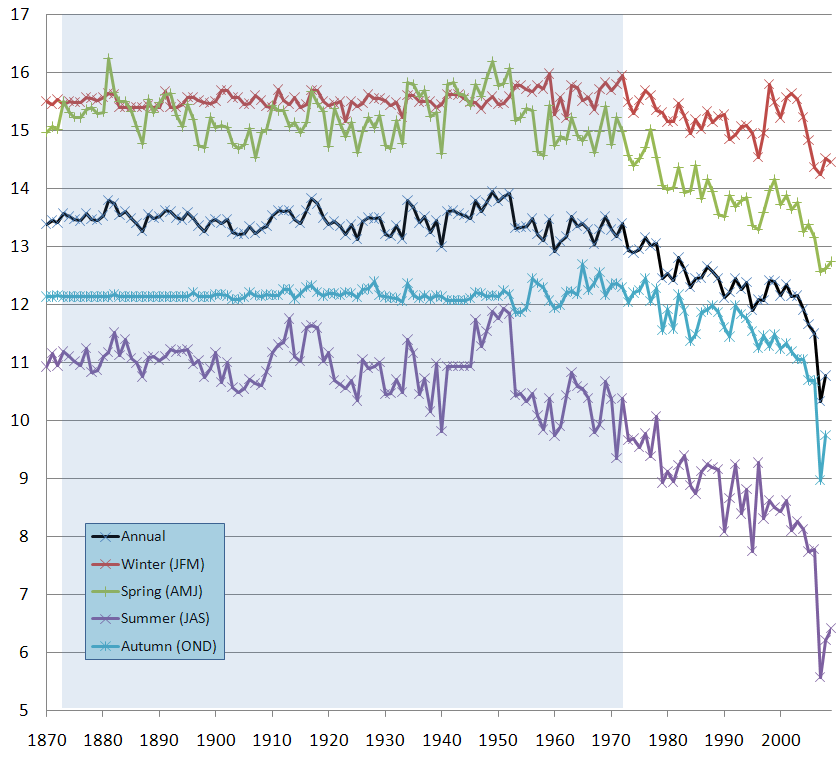
1870–2009 Northern Hemisphere sea ice extent in million square kilometers. Blue shading indicates the pre-satellite era; data then is less reliable.

More recently, the mass of Greenland's ice sheet has declined an average 266 billion metric tons per year since 2002.

Sea ice in the Arctic region has declined in recent decades in area and volume due to climate change. It has been melting more in summer than it refreezes in winter. Global warming, caused by greenhouse gas forcing is responsible for the decline in Arctic sea ice. The decline of sea ice in the Arctic has been accelerating during the early twenty-first century, with a decline rate of 4.7% per decade (it has declined over 50% since the first satellite records). Summertime sea ice will likely cease to exist sometime during the 21st century.

The region is at its warmest in at least 4,000 years. Furthermore, the Arctic-wide melt season has lengthened at a rate of five days per decade (from 1979 to 2013), dominated by a later autumn freeze-up. The IPCC Sixth Assessment Report (2021) stated that Arctic sea ice area will likely drop below 1 million km^{2} in at least some Septembers before 2050. In September 2020, the US National Snow and Ice Data Center reported that the Arctic sea ice in 2020 had melted to an extent of 3.74 million km^{2}, its second-smallest extent since records began in 1979. Earth lost 28 trillion tonnes of ice between 1994 and 2017, with Arctic sea ice accounting for 7.6 trillion tonnes of this loss. The rate of ice loss has risen by 57% since the 1990s.

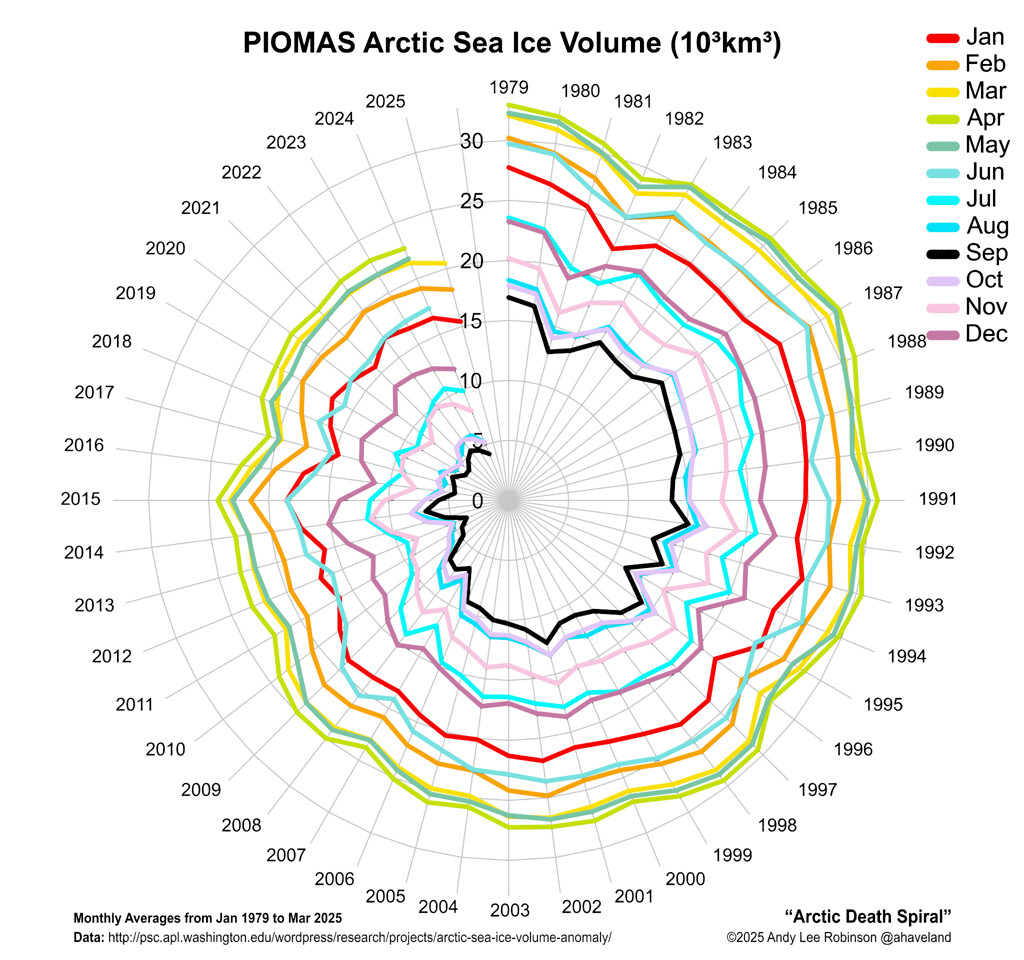
Month-by-month chart shows how minimum ice volume usually occurs in September, and maxima usually occurring in April.

Decade-by-decade progression of arctic sea ice melting shows continued ice loss, with the greatest percentage loss rate experienced in the late summer and early autumn.

==== Greenland ice sheet ====
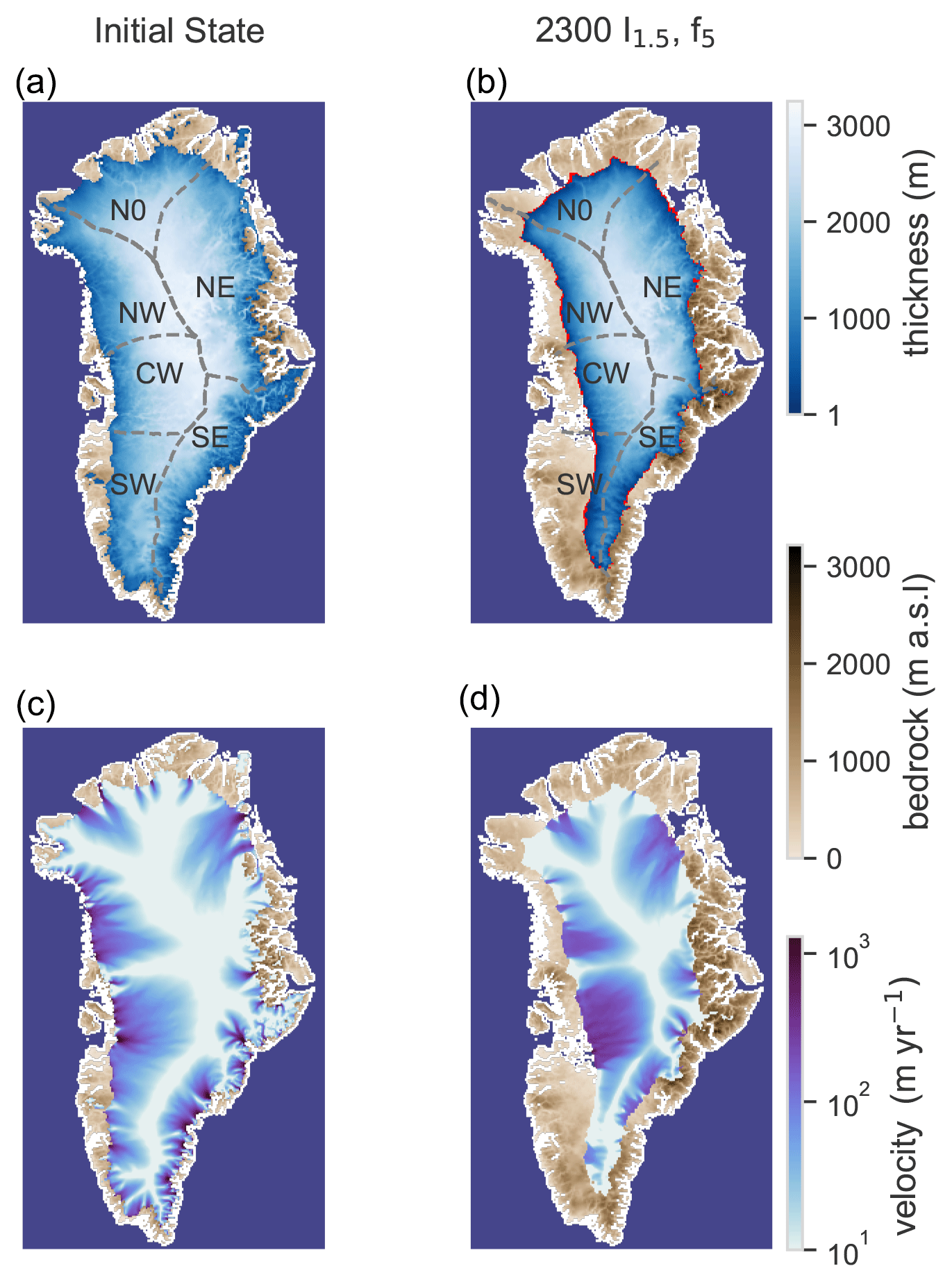
2023 projections of how much the Greenland ice sheet may shrink from its present extent by the year 2300 under the worst possible climate change scenario (upper half) and of how much faster its remaining ice will be flowing in that case (lower half)

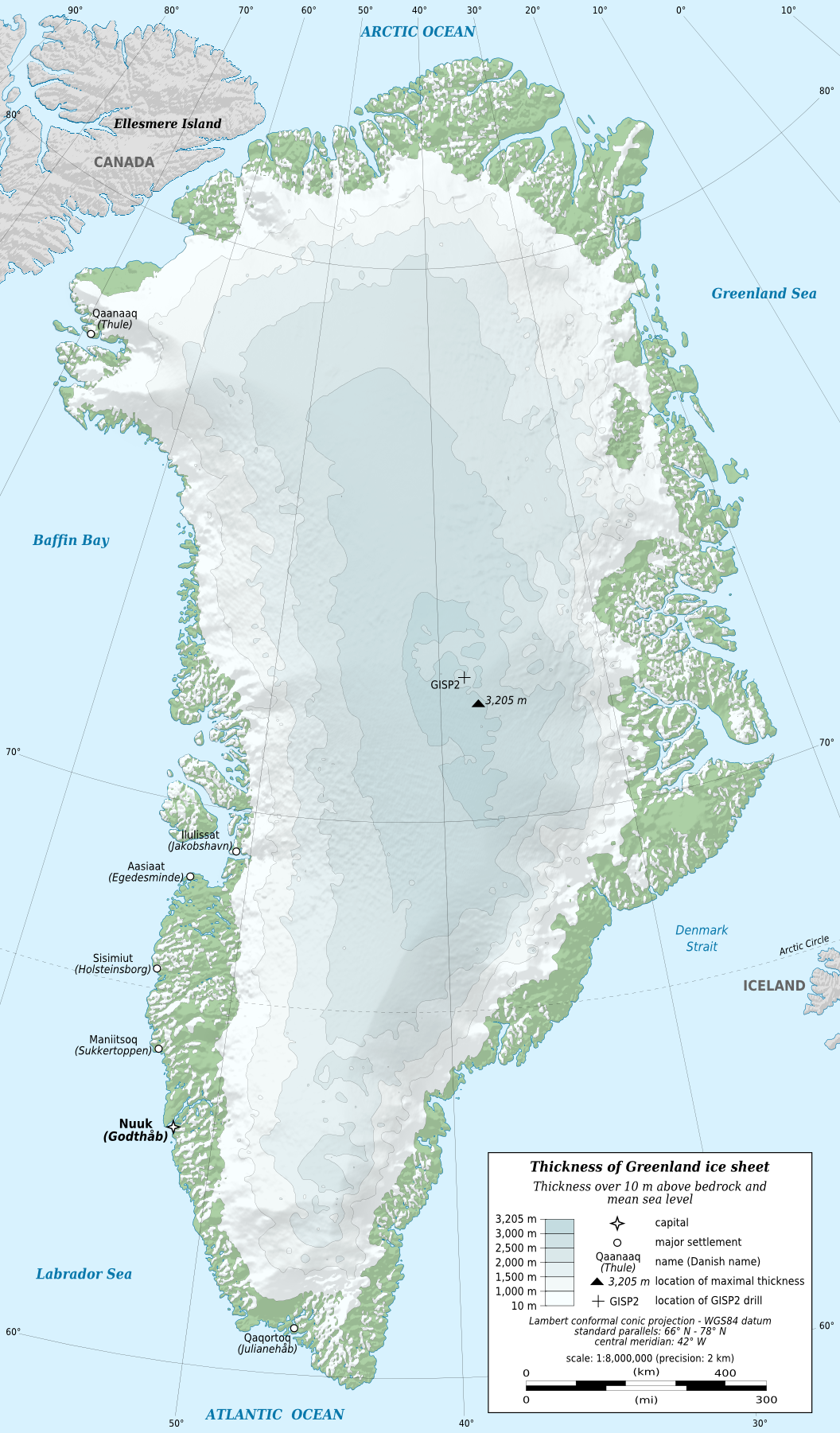

Greenland has had major glaciers and ice caps for at least 18 million years, but a single ice sheet first covered most of the island some 2.6 million years ago. Since then, it has both grown and contracted significantly. The oldest known ice on Greenland is about 1 million years old. Due to anthropogenic greenhouse gas emissions, the ice sheet is now the warmest it has been in the past 1000 years, and is losing ice at the fastest rate in at least the past 12,000 years.

Every summer, parts of the surface melt and ice cliffs calve into the sea. Normally the ice sheet would be replenished by winter snowfall, but due to global warming the ice sheet is melting two to five times faster than before 1850, and snowfall has not kept up since 1996. If the Paris Agreement goal of staying below 2 °C (3.6 °F) is achieved, melting of Greenland ice alone would still add around 6 cm (2 1/2 in) to global sea level rise by the end of the century. If there are no reductions in emissions, melting would add around 13 cm (5 in) by 2100, with a worst-case of about 33 cm (13 in). For comparison, melting has so far contributed 1.4 cm (1/2 in) since 1972, while sea level rise from all sources was 15–25 cm (6–10 in) between 1901 and 2018.

If all 2,900,000 cubic kilometres (696,000 cu mi) of the ice sheet were to melt, it would increase global sea levels by ~7.4 m (24 ft). Global warming between 1.7 °C (3.1 °F) and 2.3 °C (4.1 °F) would likely make this melting inevitable. However, 1.5 °C (2.7 °F) would still cause ice loss equivalent to 1.4 m (4 1/2 ft) of sea level rise, and more ice will be lost if the temperatures exceed that level before declining. If global temperatures continue to rise, the ice sheet will likely disappear within 10,000 years. At very high warming, its future lifetime goes down to around 1,000 years. Beneath the Greenland ice sheet are mountains and lake basins.

=== Lakes ===
A January 2025 study published in the Proceedings of the National Academy of Sciences reported an "abrupt, coherent, climate-driven transformation" from "blue" (more transparent) to "brown" (less transparent) states of lakes in Greenland after a season of both record heat and rainfall drove a state change in these systems. This change was said to alter "numerous physical, chemical, and biological lake features", and the state changes were said to be unprecedented.

== Biological environment ==
=== Impacts on Arctic flora ===
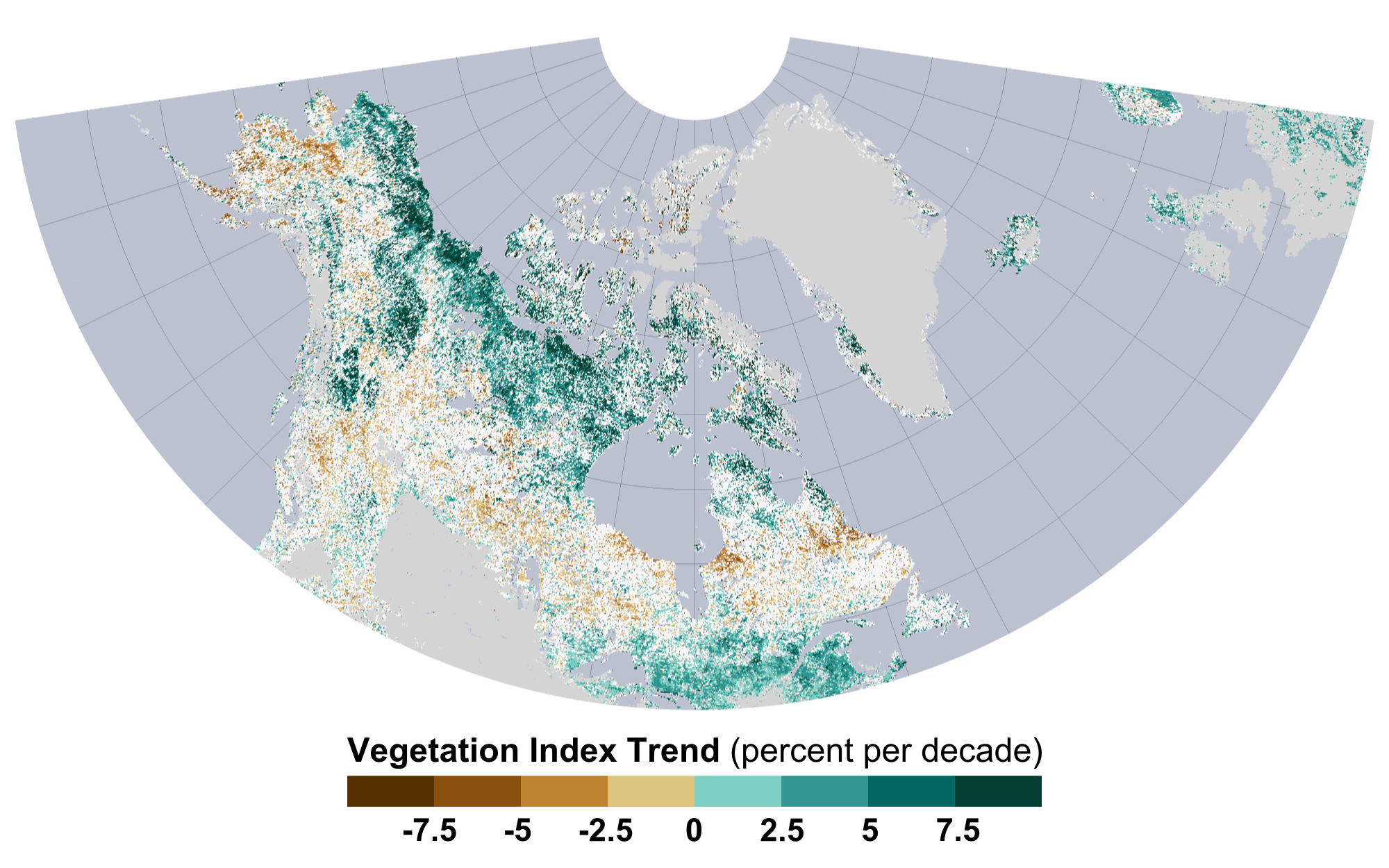
Western Hemisphere Arctic Vegetation Index Trend

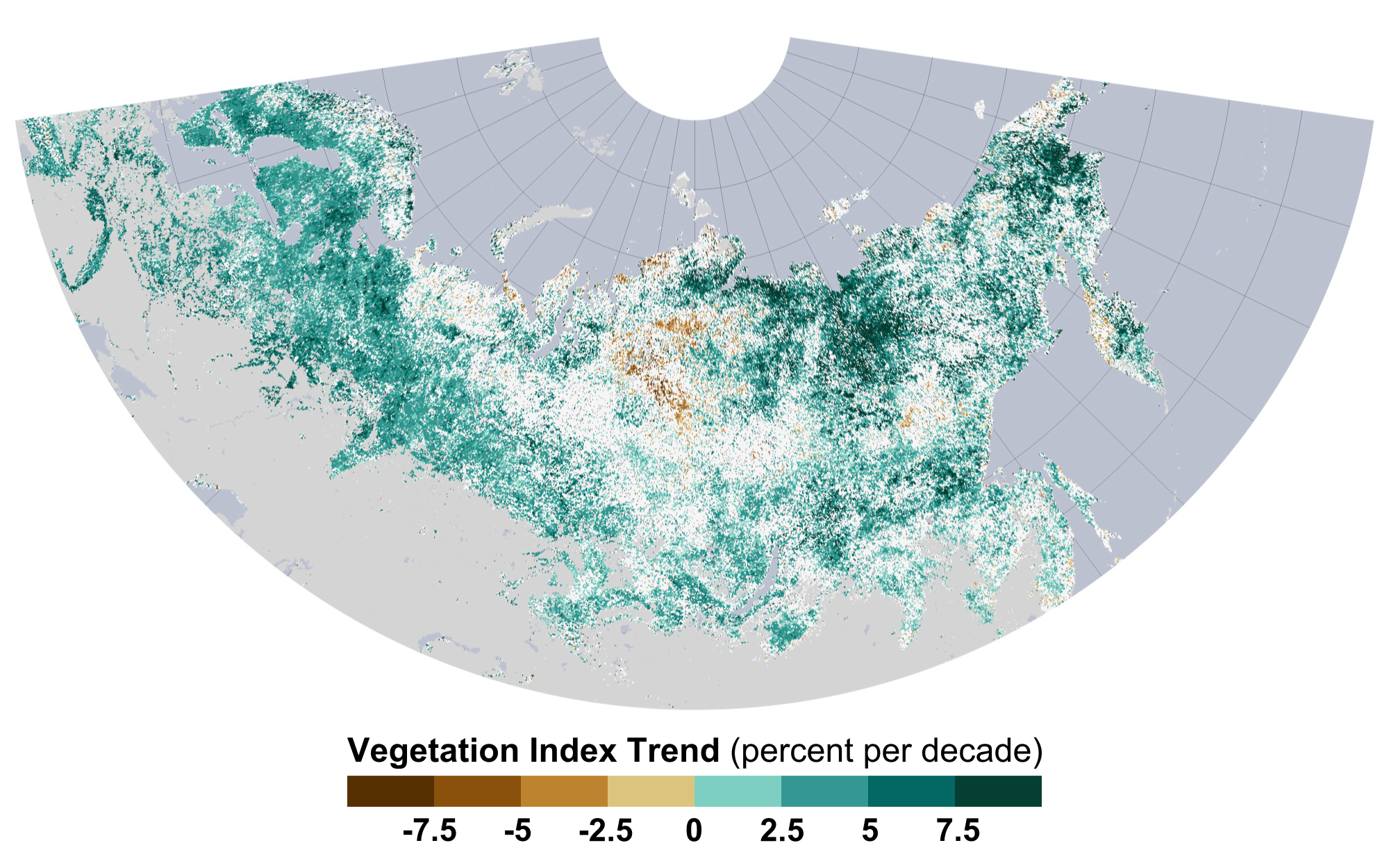
Eastern Hemisphere Vegetation Index Trend

Climate change is expected to have a strong effect on the Arctic's flora, some of which is already being seen. NASA and NOAA have continuously monitored Arctic vegetation with satellite instruments such as Moderate Resolution Imaging Spectroradiometer (MODIS) and Advanced Very-High-Resolution Radiometer (AVHRR). Their data allows scientists to calculate so-called "Arctic greening" and "Arctic browning". From 1985 to 2016, greening has occurred in 37.3% of all sites sampled in the tundra, whereas browning was observed only in 4.7% of the sites - typically the ones that were still experiencing cooling and drying, as opposed to warming and wettening for the rest.

This expansion of vegetation in the Arctic is not equivalent across types of vegetation. A major trend has been from shrub-type plants taking over areas previously dominated by moss and lichens. This change contributes to the consideration that the tundra biome is currently experiencing the most rapid change of any terrestrial biomes on the planet. The direct impact on mosses and lichens is unclear as there exist very few studies at species level, but climate change is more likely to cause increased fluctuation and more frequent extreme events. While shrubs may increase in range and biomass, warming may also cause a decline in cushion plants such as moss campion, and since cushion plants act as facilitator species across trophic levels and fill important ecological niches in several environments, this could cause cascading effects in these ecosystems that could severely affect the way in which they function and are structured.

The expansion of these shrubs can also have strong effects on other important ecological dynamics, such as the albedo effect. These shrubs change the winter surface of the tundra from undisturbed, uniform snow to mixed surface with protruding branches disrupting the snow cover, this type of snow cover has a lower albedo effect, with reductions of up to 55%, which contributes to a positive feedback loop on regional and global climate warming. This reduction of the albedo effect means that more radiation is absorbed by plants, and thus, surface temperatures increase, which could disrupt current surface-atmosphere energy exchanges and affect thermal regimes of permafrost. Carbon cycling is also being affected by these changes in vegetation, as parts of the tundra increase their shrub cover, they behave more like boreal forests in terms of carbon cycling. This is speeding up the carbon cycle, as warmer temperatures lead to increased permafrost thawing and carbon release, but also carbon capturing from plants that have increased growth. It is not certain whether this balance will go in one direction or the other, but studies have found that it is more likely that this will eventually lead to increased CO_{2} in the atmosphere.

However, boreal forests, particularly those in North America, showed a different response to warming. Many boreal forests greened, but the trend was not as strong as it was for tundra of the circumpolar Arctic, mostly characterized by shrub expansion and increased growth. In North America, some boreal forests actually experienced browning over the study period. Droughts, increased forest fire activity, animal behavior, industrial pollution, and a number of other factors may have contributed to browning.

=== Impacts on terrestrial fauna ===
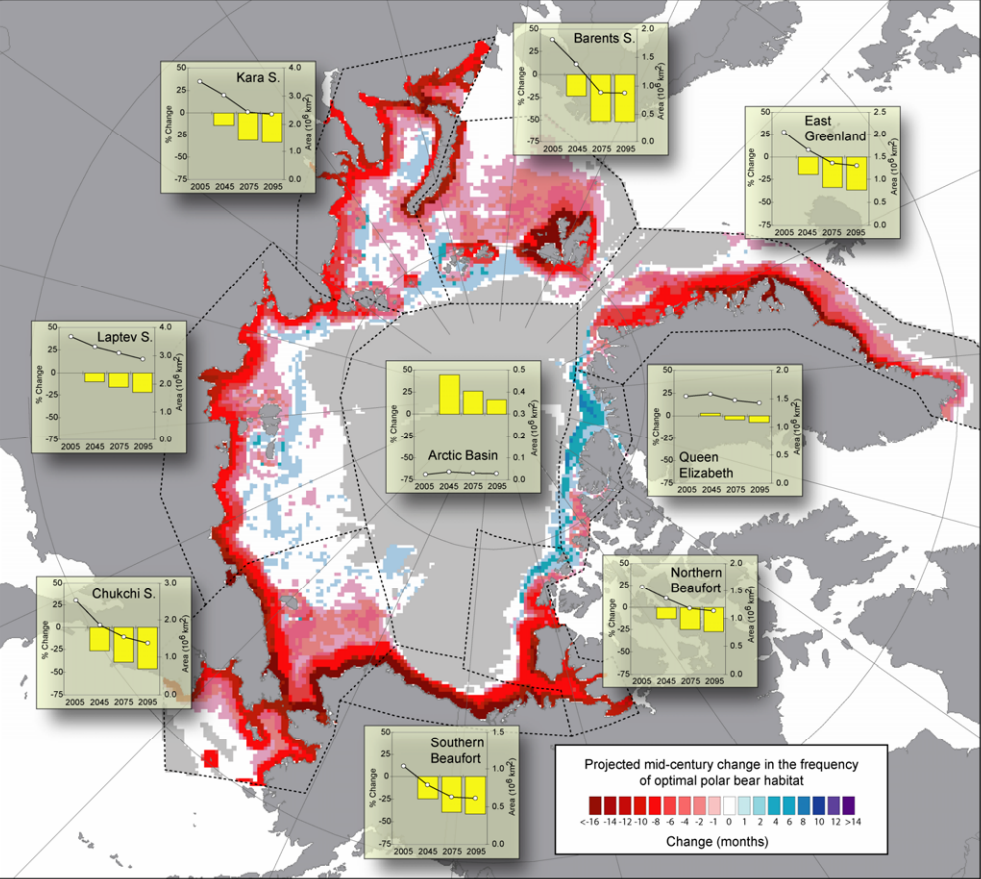
Projected change in polar bear habitat from 2001–2010 to 2041–2050

Arctic warming negatively affects the foraging and breeding ecology of native Arctic mammals, such as Arctic foxes or Arctic reindeer. In July 2019, 200 Svalbard reindeer were found starved to death apparently due to low precipitation related to climate change. This was only one episode in the long-term decline of the species. United States Geological Survey research suggests that the shrinkage of Arctic sea ice would eventually extirpate polar bears from Alaska, but leave some of their habitat in the Canadian Arctic Archipelago and areas off the northern Greenland coast.

As the pure Arctic climate is gradually replaced by the subarctic climate, animals adapted to those conditions spread to the north. For instance, beavers have been actively colonizing Arctic regions, and as they create dams, they flood areas which used to be permafrost, contributing to its thaw and methane emissions from it. These colonizing species can outright replace native species, and they may also interbreed with their southern relations, like in the case of the Grizzly–polar bear hybrid. This usually has the effect of reducing the genetic diversity of the genus. Infectious diseases, such as brucellosis or phocine distemper virus, may spread to populations previously separated by the cold, or, in case of the marine mammals, the sea ice.

=== Marine ecosystems ===
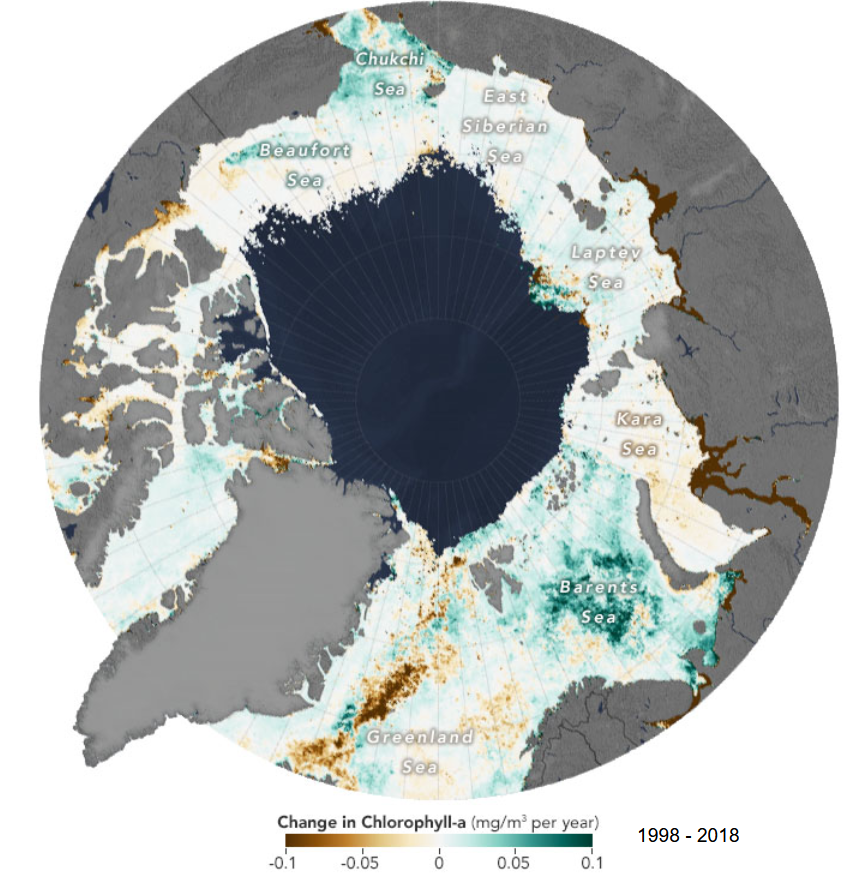
The observed increase in phytoplankton biomass in the Arctic since 1998

The reduction of sea ice has brought more sunlight to the phytoplankton and increased the annual marine primary production in the Arctic by over 30% between 1998 and 2020. As the result, the Arctic Ocean became a stronger carbon sink over this period; yet, it still accounts for only 5% to 14% of the total ocean carbon sink, although it is expected to play a larger role in the future. By 2100, phytoplankton biomass in the Arctic Ocean is generally expected to increase by ~20% relative to 2000 under the low-emission scenario, and by 30-40% under the high-emission scenario.

Atlantic cod have been able to move deeper into the Arctic due to the warming waters, while the Polar cod and local marine mammals have been losing habitat. Many copepod species appear to be declining, which is also likely to reduce the numbers of fish which prey on them, such as walleye pollock or the arrowtooth flounder. This also affects Arctic shorebirds. For instance, around 9000 puffins and other shorebirds in Alaska died of starvation in 2016, because too many fish have moved to the north. While the shorebirds also appear to nest more successfully due to the observed warming, this benefit may be more than offset by phenological mismatch between shorebirds' and other species' life cycles. Marine mammals such as ringed seals and walruses are also being negatively affected by the warming.

== Greenhouse gas emissions from the Arctic ==
In 2024, the Arctic has transformed from a carbon sink to a carbon source due to the impacts of climate change, mainly rising temperatures and wildfires.

=== Permafrost thaw ===
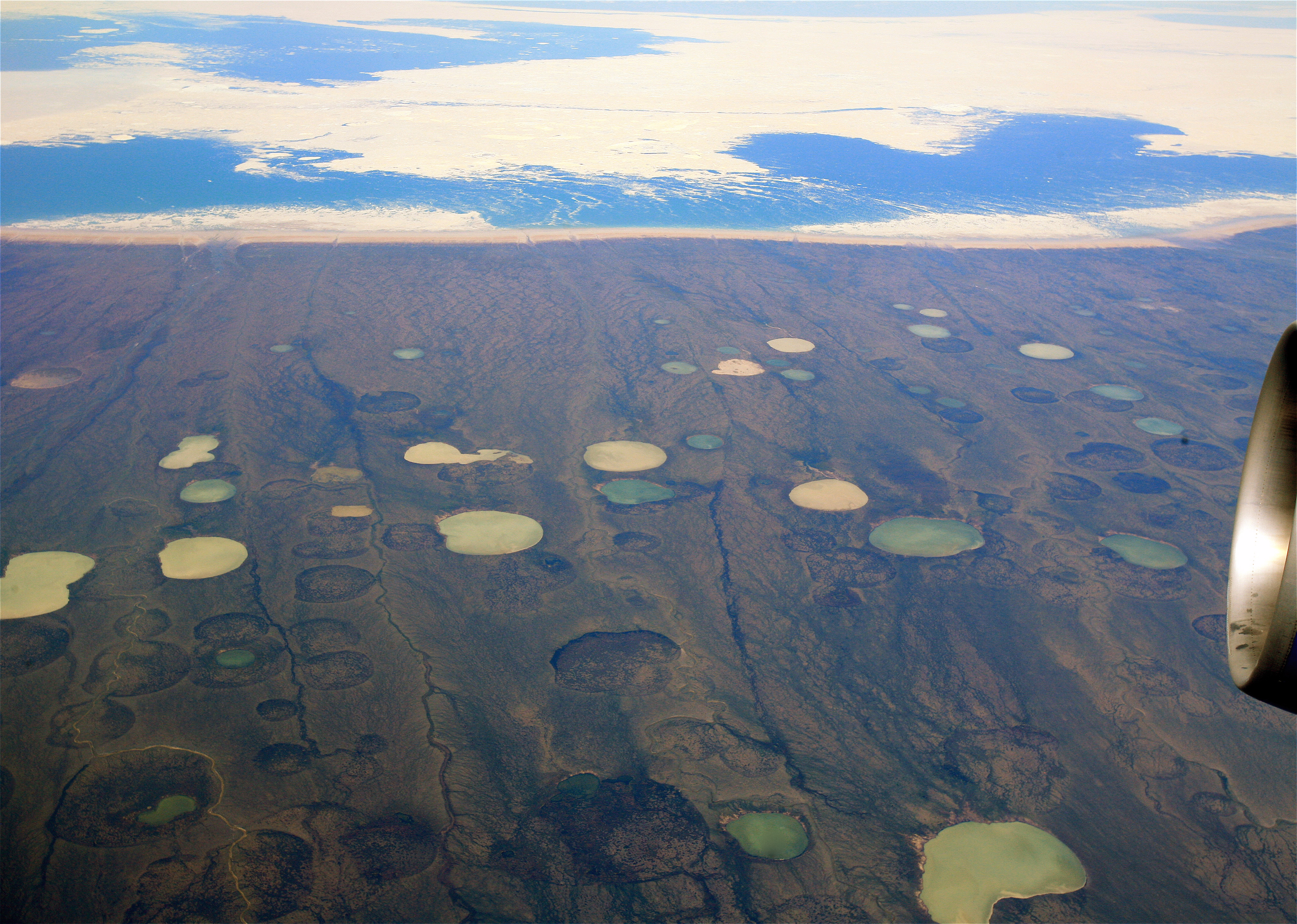
Permafrost thaw ponds on Baffin Island

Permafrost is an important component of hydrological systems and ecosystems within the Arctic landscape. In the Northern Hemisphere the terrestrial permafrost domain comprises around 18 million km^{2}. Within this permafrost region, the total soil organic carbon (SOC) stock is estimated to be 1,460-1,600 Pg (where 1 Pg = 1 billion tons), which constitutes double the amount of carbon currently contained in the atmosphere.

In 2023, Woodwell Climate Research Center received a $5 million grant and fellowship from Google.org, the philanthropic arm of Google, to develop an open-access resource that will use satellite data and artificial intelligence in order to track Arctic permafrost thaw in near real-time.

As recent warming deepens the active layer subject to permafrost thaw, this exposes formerly stored carbon to biogenic processes which facilitate its entrance into the atmosphere as carbon dioxide and methane. Because carbon emissions from permafrost thaw contribute to the same warming which facilitates the thaw, it is a well-known example of a positive climate change feedback. Permafrost thaw is sometimes included as one of the major tipping points in the climate system due to the exhibition of local thresholds and its effective irreversibility. However, while there are self-perpetuating processes that apply on the local or regional scale, it is debated as to whether it meets the strict definition of a global tipping point as in aggregate permafrost thaw is gradual with warming.

In the northern circumpolar region, permafrost contains organic matter equivalent to 1400–1650 billion tons of pure carbon, which was built up over thousands of years. This amount equals almost half of all organic material in all soils, and it is about twice the carbon content of the atmosphere, or around four times larger than the human emissions of carbon between the start of the Industrial Revolution and 2011. Further, most of this carbon (~1,035 billion tons) is stored in what is defined as the near-surface permafrost, no deeper than 3 metres (9.8 ft) below the surface. However, only a fraction of this stored carbon is expected to enter the atmosphere. In general, the volume of permafrost in the upper 3 m of ground is expected to decrease by about 25% per 1 °C (1.8 °F) of global warming, yet even under the RCP8.5 scenario associated with over 4 °C (7.2 °F) of global warming by the end of the 21st century, about 5% to 15% of permafrost carbon is expected to be lost "over decades and centuries".

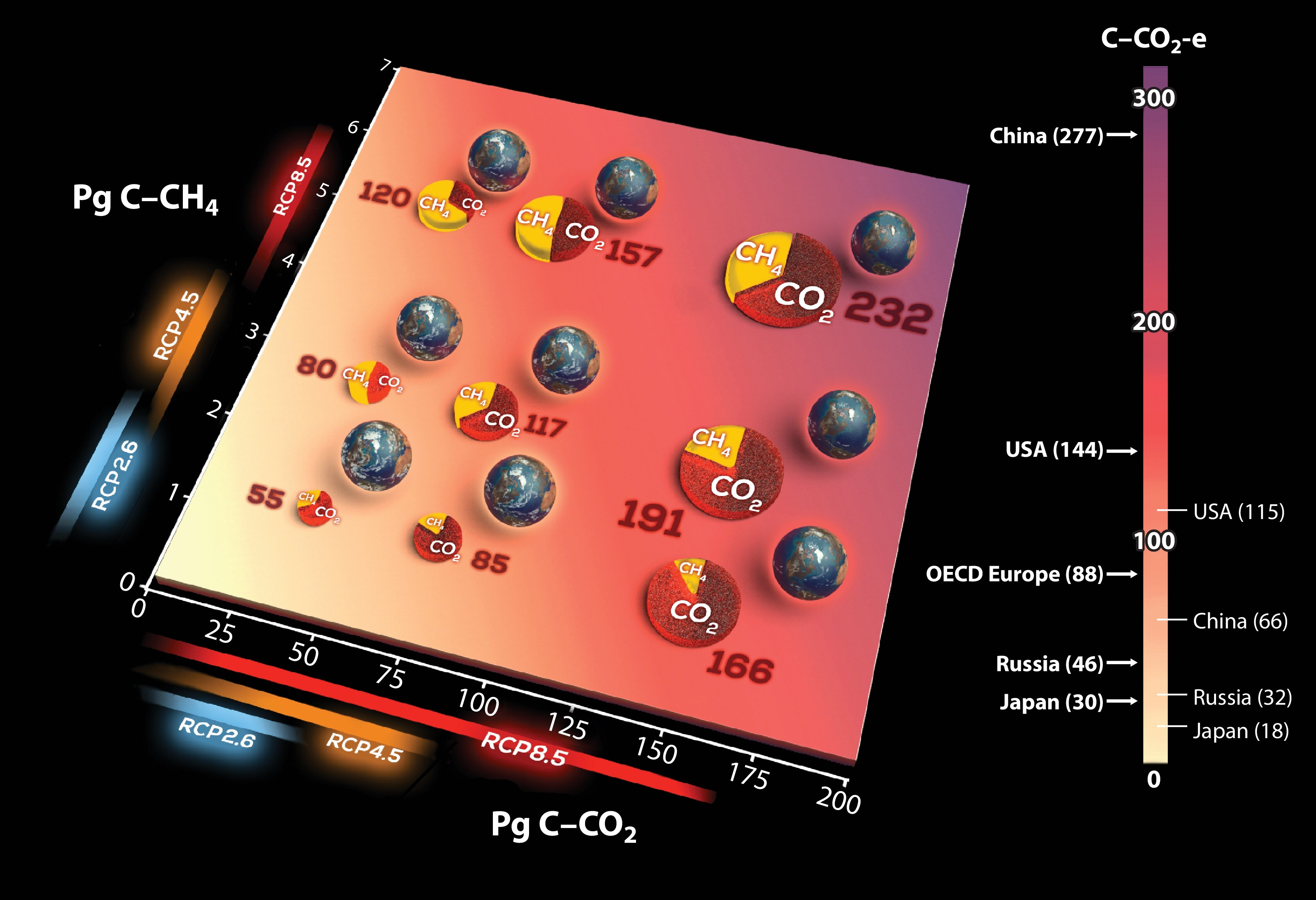
Nine probable scenarios of greenhouse gas emissions from permafrost thaw during the 21st century, which show a limited, moderate and intense CO_{2} and CH_{4} emission response to low, medium and high-emission Representative Concentration Pathways. The vertical bar uses emissions of selected large countries as a comparison: the right-hand side of the scale shows their cumulative emissions since the start of the Industrial Revolution, while the left-hand side shows each country's cumulative emissions for the rest of the 21st century if they remained unchanged from their 2019 levels.

Altogether, it is expected that cumulative greenhouse gas emissions from permafrost thaw will be smaller than the cumulative anthropogenic emissions, yet still substantial on a global scale, with some experts comparing them to emissions caused by deforestation. The IPCC Sixth Assessment Report estimates that carbon dioxide and methane released from permafrost could amount to the equivalent of 14–175 billion tonnes of carbon dioxide per 1 °C (1.8 °F) of warming. For comparison, by 2019, annual anthropogenic emissions of carbon dioxide alone stood around 40 billion tonnes. A major review published in the year 2022 concluded that if the goal of preventing 2 °C (3.6 °F) of warming was realized, then the average annual permafrost emissions throughout the 21st century would be equivalent to the year 2019 annual emissions of Russia. Under RCP4.5, a scenario considered close to the current trajectory and where the warming stays slightly below 3 °C (5.4 °F), annual permafrost emissions would be comparable to year 2019 emissions of Western Europe or the United States, while under the scenario of high global warming and worst-case permafrost feedback response, they would approach year 2019 emissions of China.

Fewer studies have attempted to describe the impact directly in terms of warming. A 2018 paper estimated that if global warming was limited to 2 °C (3.6 °F), gradual permafrost thaw would add around 0.09 °C (0.16 °F) to global temperatures by 2100, while a 2022 review concluded that every 1 °C (1.8 °F) of global warming would cause 0.04 °C (0.072 °F) and 0.11 °C (0.20 °F) from abrupt thaw by the year 2100 and 2300. Around 4 °C (7.2 °F) of global warming, abrupt (around 50 years) and widespread collapse of permafrost areas could occur, resulting in an additional warming of 0.2–0.4 °C (0.36–0.72 °F).

=== Black carbon ===
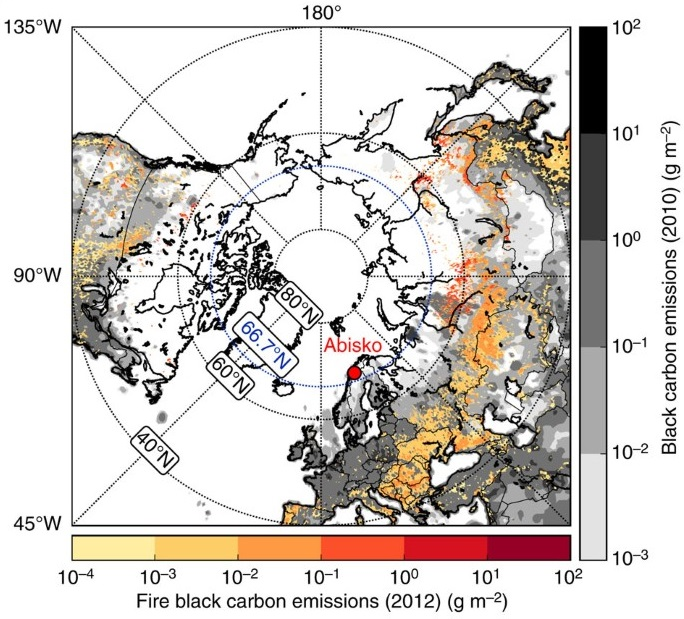
Black carbon emissions from fire and human activities around the Arctic in the year 2012, as measured from a research station in Abisko

Black carbon deposits (from the combustion of heavy fuel oil (HFO) of Arctic shipping) absorb solar radiation in the atmosphere and strongly reduce the albedo when deposited on snow and ice, thus accelerating the effect of the melting of snow and sea ice. A 2013 study quantified that gas flaring at petroleum extraction sites contributed over 40% of the black carbon deposited in the Arctic. 2019 research attributed the majority (56%) of Arctic surface black carbon to emissions from Russia, followed by European emissions, and Asia also being a large source. In 2015, research suggested that reducing black carbon emissions and short-lived greenhouse gases by roughly 60 percent by 2050 could cool the Arctic up to 0.2 °C. However, a 2019 study indicates that "Black carbon emissions will continuously rise due to increased shipping activities", specifically fishing vessels.

The number of wildfires in the Arctic Circle has increased. In 2020, Arctic wildfire CO_{2} emissions broke a new record, peaking at 244 megatonnes of carbon dioxide emitted. This is due to the burning of peatlands, carbon-rich soils that originate from the accumulation of waterlogged plants which are mostly found at Arctic latitudes. These peatlands are becoming more likely to burn as temperatures increase, but their own burning and releasing of CO_{2} contributes to their own likelihood of burning in a positive feedback loop. The smoke from wildfires defined as "brown carbon" also increases arctic warming, with its warming effect is around 30% that of black carbon. As wildfires increases with warming this creates a positive feedback loop.

=== Methane clathrate deposits ===
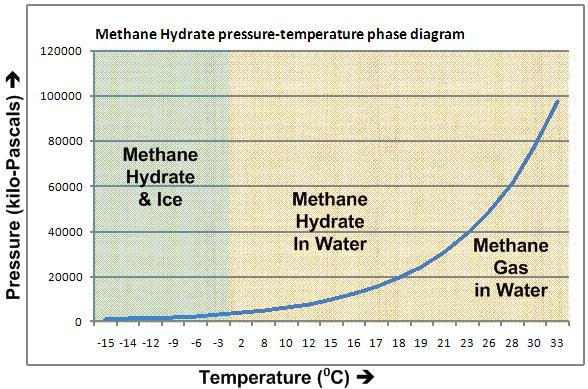
Methane clathrate is released as gas into the surrounding water column or soils when ambient temperature increases.

The clathrate gun hypothesis is a proposed explanation for the periods of rapid warming during the Quaternary. The hypothesis is that changes in fluxes in upper intermediate waters in the ocean caused temperature fluctuations that alternately accumulated and occasionally released methane clathrate on upper continental slopes. This would have had an immediate impact on the global temperature, as methane is a much more powerful greenhouse gas than carbon dioxide. Despite its atmospheric lifetime of around 12 years, methane's global warming potential is 72 times greater than that of carbon dioxide over 20 years, and 25 times over 100 years (33 when accounting for aerosol interactions). It is further proposed that these warming events caused the Bond cycles and individual interstadial events, such as the Dansgaard–Oeschger interstadials.

In 2018, a perspective piece devoted to tipping points in the climate system suggested that the climate change contribution from methane hydrates would be "negligible" by the end of the century, but could amount to 0.4–0.5 °C (0.72–0.90 °F) on the millennial timescales. In 2021, the IPCC Sixth Assessment Report no longer included methane hydrates in the list of potential tipping points, and says that "it is very unlikely that CH_{4} emissions from clathrates will substantially warm the climate system over the next few centuries." The report had also linked terrestrial hydrate deposits to gas emission craters discovered in the Yamal Peninsula in Siberia, Russia beginning in July 2014, but noted that since terrestrial gas hydrates predominantly form at a depth below 200 meters, a substantial response within the next few centuries can be ruled out. Likewise, a 2022 assessment of tipping points described methane hydrates as a "threshold-free feedback" rather than a tipping point.

== Effects on other parts of the world ==
=== On ocean circulation ===
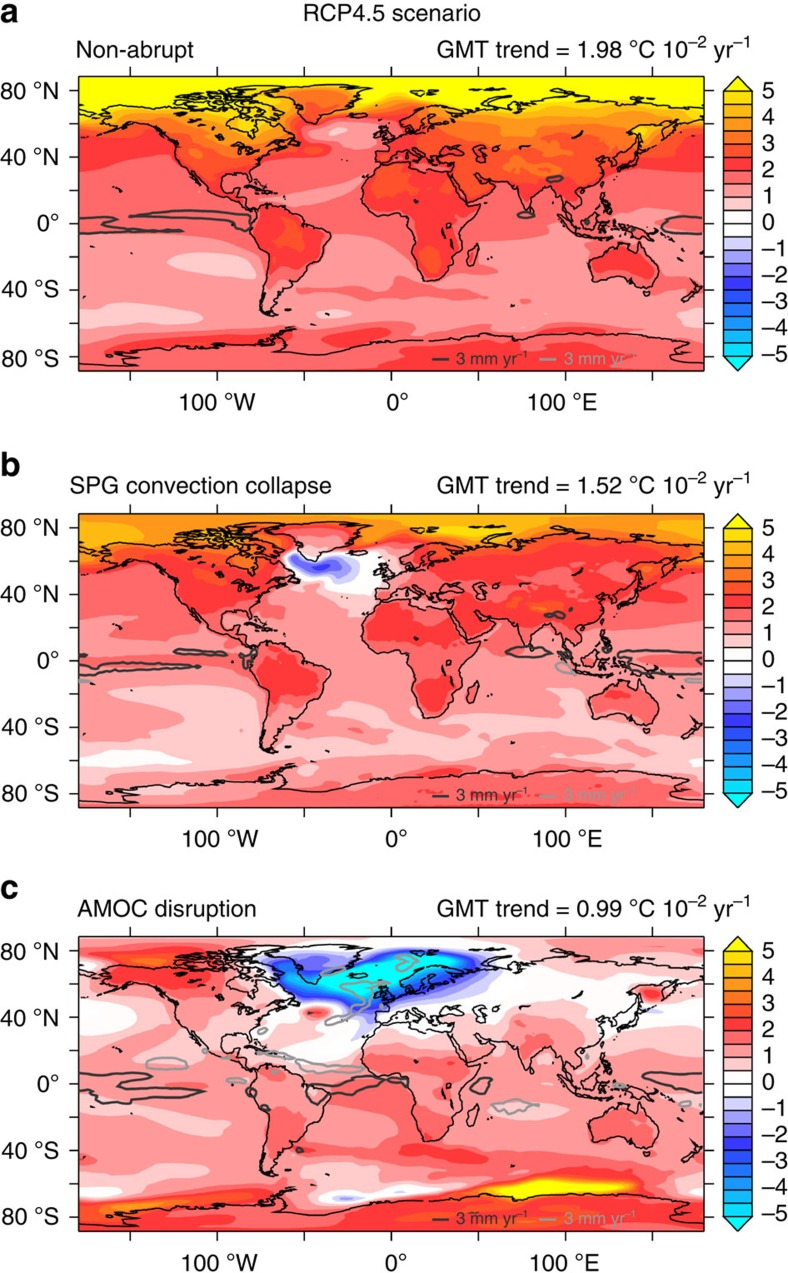
Modelled 21st century warming under the "intermediate" global warming scenario (top). The potential collapse of the subpolar gyre in this scenario (middle). The collapse of the entire Atlantic Meriditional Overturning Circulation (bottom).

The Atlantic meridional overturning circulation (AMOC) is the main ocean current system in the Atlantic Ocean. It is a major component of Earth's ocean circulation system and plays an important role in the planet's climate system. The AMOC includes Atlantic currents at the surface and at great depths that are driven by changes in weather, temperature and salinity. Those currents comprise half of the global thermohaline circulation that includes the flow of major ocean currents, the other half being the Southern Ocean overturning circulation.

The AMOC has not always existed; for much of Earth's history, overturning circulation in the northern hemisphere occurred in the North Pacific. Paleoclimate evidence shows the shift of overturning circulation from the Pacific to the Atlantic occurred 34 million years ago at the Eocene-Oligocene transition, when the Arctic-Atlantic gateway had closed. This closure fundamentally changed the thermohaline circulation structure; some researchers have suggested climate change may eventually reverse this shift and re-establish the Pacific circulation after the AMOC shuts down. Climate change affects the AMOC by making surface water warmer as a consequence of Earth's energy imbalance and by making surface water less saline due to the addition of large quantities of fresh water from melting ice – mainly from Greenland – and through increasing precipitation over the North Atlantic. Both of these causes would increase the difference between the surface and deep layers, thus making the upwelling and downwelling that drives the circulation more difficult.

Severe weakening of the AMOC may lead to a collapse of the circulation, which would not be reversible and thus would constitute one of the tipping points in the climate system. A collapse would substantially lower the average temperature and amount of rain and snowfall in Europe. It may also raise the frequency of extreme weather events and have other severe effects.

In 2021, the IPCC Sixth Assessment Report again said the AMOC is "very likely" to decline within the 21st century and that there was a "high confidence" changes to it would be reversible within centuries if warming was reversed. Unlike the Fifth Assessment Report, it had only "medium confidence" rather than "high confidence" in the AMOC avoiding a collapse before the end of the 21st century. This reduction in confidence was likely influenced by several review studies that draw attention to the circulation stability bias within general circulation models, and simplified ocean-modelling studies suggesting the AMOC may be more vulnerable to abrupt change than larger-scale models suggest.

The synthesis report of the IPCC Sixth Assessment Report summarized the scientific consensus as follows: "The Atlantic Meridional Overturning Circulation is very likely to weaken over the 21st century for all considered scenarios (high confidence), however an abrupt collapse is not expected before 2100 (medium confidence). If such a low probability event were to occur, it would very likely cause abrupt shifts in regional weather patterns and water cycle, such as a southward shift in the tropical rain belt, and large impacts on ecosystems and human activities."

=== On mid-latitude weather ===
Since the early 2000s, climate models have consistently identified that global warming will gradually push jet streams poleward. In 2008, this was confirmed by observational evidence, which proved that from 1979 to 2001, the northern jet stream moved northward at an average rate of 2.01 kilometres (1.25 mi) per year, with a similar trend in the southern hemisphere jet stream. Climate scientists have hypothesized that the jet stream will also gradually weaken as a result of global warming. Trends such as Arctic sea ice decline, reduced snow cover, evapotranspiration patterns, and other weather anomalies have caused the Arctic to heat up faster than other parts of the globe, in what is known as the Arctic amplification. In 2021–2022, it was found that since 1979, the warming within the Arctic Circle has been nearly four times faster than the global average, and some hotspots in the Barents Sea area warmed up to seven times faster than the global average. While the Arctic remains one of the coldest places on Earth today, the temperature gradient between it and the warmer parts of the globe will continue to diminish with every decade of global warming as the result of this amplification. If this gradient has a strong influence on the jet stream, then it will eventually become weaker and more variable in its course, which would allow more cold air from the polar vortex to leak mid-latitudes and slow the progression of Rossby waves, leading to more persistent and more extreme weather.

The hypothesis above is closely associated with Jennifer Francis, who had first proposed it in a 2012 paper co-authored by Stephen J. Vavrus. While some paleoclimate reconstructions have suggested that the polar vortex becomes more variable and causes more unstable weather during periods of warming back in 1997, this was contradicted by climate modelling, with PMIP2 simulations finding in 2010 that the Arctic Oscillation (AO) was much weaker and more negative during the Last Glacial Maximum, and suggesting that warmer periods have stronger positive phase AO, and thus less frequent leaks of the polar vortex air. However, a 2012 review in the Journal of the Atmospheric Sciences noted that "there [has been] a significant change in the vortex mean state over the twenty-first century, resulting in a weaker, more disturbed vortex.", which contradicted the modelling results but fit the Francis-Vavrus hypothesis. Additionally, a 2013 study noted that the then-current CMIP5 tended to strongly underestimate winter blocking trends, and other 2012 research had suggested a connection between declining Arctic sea ice and heavy snowfall during midlatitude winters.

However, because the specific observations are considered short-term observations, there is considerable uncertainty in the conclusions. Climatology observations require several decades to definitively distinguish various forms of natural variability from climate trends. This point was stressed by reviews in 2013 and in 2017. A study in 2014 concluded that Arctic amplification significantly decreased cold-season temperature variability over the northern hemisphere in recent decades. Cold Arctic air intrudes into the warmer lower latitudes more rapidly today during autumn and winter, a trend projected to continue in the future except during summer, thus calling into question whether winters will bring more cold extremes. A 2019 analysis of a data set collected from 35 182 weather stations worldwide, including 9116 whose records go beyond 50 years, found a sharp decrease in northern midlatitude cold waves since the 1980s.

Moreover, a range of long-term observational data collected during the 2010s and published in 2020 suggests that the intensification of Arctic amplification since the early 2010s was not linked to significant changes on mid-latitude atmospheric patterns. State-of-the-art modelling research of PAMIP (Polar Amplification Model Intercomparison Project) improved upon the 2010 findings of PMIP2; it found that sea ice decline would weaken the jet stream and increase the probability of atmospheric blocking, but the connection was very minor, and typically insignificant next to interannual variability. In 2022, a follow-up study found that while the PAMIP average had likely underestimated the weakening caused by sea ice decline by 1.2 to 3 times, even the corrected connection still amounts to only 10% of the jet stream's natural variability.

== Impacts on people ==
=== Territorial claims ===
Growing evidence that global warming is shrinking polar ice has added to the urgency of several nations' Arctic territorial claims in hopes of establishing resource development and new shipping lanes, in addition to protecting sovereign rights.

As ice sea coverage decreases more and more, year on year, Arctic countries (Russia, Canada, Finland, Iceland, Norway, Sweden, the United States and Denmark representing Greenland) are making moves on the geopolitical stage to ensure access to potential new shipping lanes, oil and gas reserves, leading to overlapping claims across the region.

There is more activity in terms of maritime boundaries between countries, where overlapping claims for internal waters, territorial seas and particularly Exclusive Economic Zones (EEZs) can cause frictions between nations. Currently, official maritime borders have an unclaimed triangle of international waters lying between them, that is at the centerpoint of international disputes.

This unclaimed land can be obtainable by submitting a claim to the United Nations Convention on the Law of the Sea, these claims can be based on geological evidence that continental shelves extend beyond their current maritime borders and into international waters.

Some overlapping claims are still pending resolution by international bodies, such as a large portion containing the north pole that is both claimed by Denmark and Russia, with some parts of it also contested by Canada. Another example is that of the Northwest Passage, globally recognized as international waters, but technically in Canadian waters. This has led to Canada wanting to limit the number of ships that can go through for environmental reasons but the United States disputes that they have the authority to do so, favouring unlimited passage of vessels.

=== Navigation ===
The Transpolar Sea Route is a future Arctic shipping lane running from the Atlantic Ocean to the Pacific Ocean across the center of the Arctic Ocean. The route is also sometimes called Trans-Arctic Route. In contrast to the Northeast Passage (including the Northern Sea Route) and the North-West Passage it largely avoids the territorial waters of Arctic states and lies in international high seas.

Governments and private industry have shown a growing interest in the Arctic. Major new shipping lanes are opening up: the northern sea route had 34 passages in 2011 while the Northwest Passage had 22 traverses, more than any time in history. Shipping companies may benefit from the shortened distance of these northern routes. Access to natural resources will increase, including valuable minerals and offshore oil and gas. Finding and controlling these resources will be difficult with the continually moving ice. Tourism may also increase as less sea ice will improve safety and accessibility to the Arctic.

The melting of Arctic ice caps is likely to increase traffic in and the commercial viability of the Northern Sea Route. One study, for instance, projects, "remarkable shifts in trade flows between Asia and Europe, diversion of trade within Europe, heavy shipping traffic in the Arctic and a substantial drop in Suez traffic. Projected shifts in trade also imply substantial pressure on an already threatened Arctic ecosystem."

=== Infrastructure ===
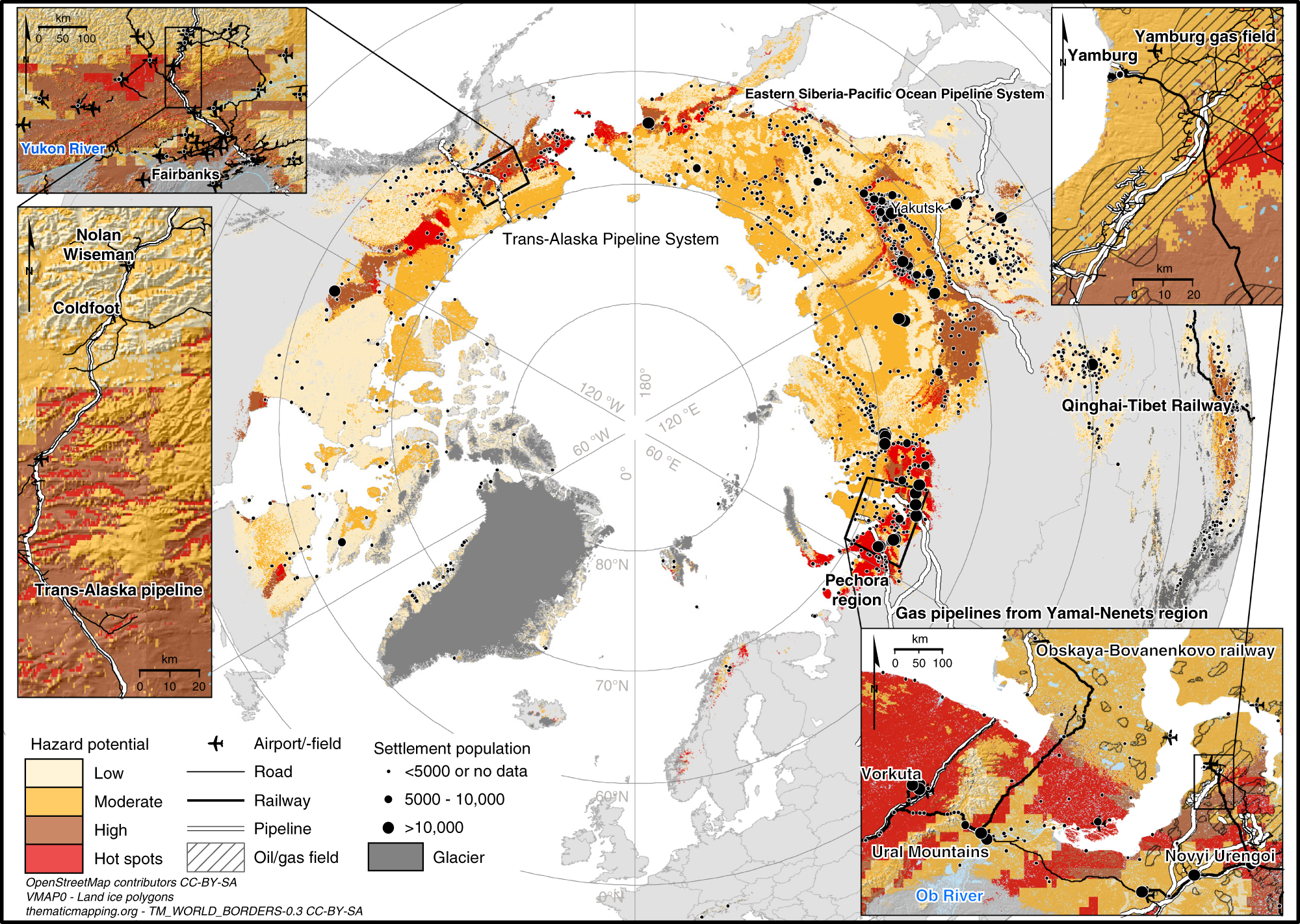
Map of likely risk to infrastructure from permafrost thaw expected to occur by 2050.

As of 2021, there are 1162 settlements located directly atop the Arctic permafrost, which host an estimated 5 million people. By 2050, permafrost layer below 42% of these settlements is expected to thaw, affecting all their inhabitants (currently 3.3 million people). Consequently, a wide range of infrastructure in permafrost areas is threatened by the thaw. By 2050, it's estimated that nearly 70% of global infrastructure located in the permafrost areas would be at high risk of permafrost thaw, including 30–50% of "critical" infrastructure. The associated costs could reach tens of billions of dollars by the second half of the century. Reducing greenhouse gas emissions in line with the Paris Agreement is projected to stabilize the risk after mid-century; otherwise, it will continue to worsen.

In Alaska alone, damages to infrastructure by the end of the century would amount to $4.6 billion (at 2015 dollar value) if RCP8.5, the high-emission climate change scenario, were realized. Over half stems from the damage to buildings ($2.8 billion), but there's also damage to roads ($700 million), railroads ($620 million), airports ($360 million) and pipelines ($170 million). Similar estimates were done for RCP4.5, a less intense scenario which leads to around 2.5 °C (4.5 °F) by 2100, a level of warming similar to the current projections. In that case, total damages from permafrost thaw are reduced to $3 billion, while damages to roads and railroads are lessened by approximately two-thirds (from $700 and $620 million to $190 and $220 million) and damages to pipelines are reduced more than ten-fold, from $170 million to $16 million. Unlike the other costs stemming from climate change in Alaska, such as damages from increased precipitation and flooding, climate change adaptation is not a viable way to reduce damages from permafrost thaw, as it would cost more than the damage incurred under either scenario.

In Canada, Northwest Territories have a population of only 45,000 people in 33 communities, yet permafrost thaw is expected to cost them $1.3 billion over 75 years, or around $51 million a year. In 2006, the cost of adapting Inuvialuit homes to permafrost thaw was estimated at $208/m^{2} if they were built at pile foundations, and $1,000/m^{2} if they didn't. At the time, the average area of a residential building in the territory was around 100 m^{2}. Thaw-induced damage is also unlikely to be covered by home insurance, and to address this reality, territorial government currently funds Contributing Assistance for Repairs and Enhancements (CARE) and Securing Assistance for Emergencies (SAFE) programs, which provide long- and short-term forgivable loans to help homeowners adapt. It is possible that in the future, mandatory relocation would instead take place as the cheaper option. However, it would effectively tear the local Inuit away from their ancestral homelands. Right now, their average personal income is only half that of the median NWT resident, meaning that adaptation costs are already disproportionate for them.

By 2022, up to 80% of buildings in some Northern Russia cities had already experienced damage. By 2050, the damage to residential infrastructure may reach $15 billion, while total public infrastructure damages could amount to 132 billion. This includes oil and gas extraction facilities, of which 45% are believed to be at risk.

=== Toxic pollution ===
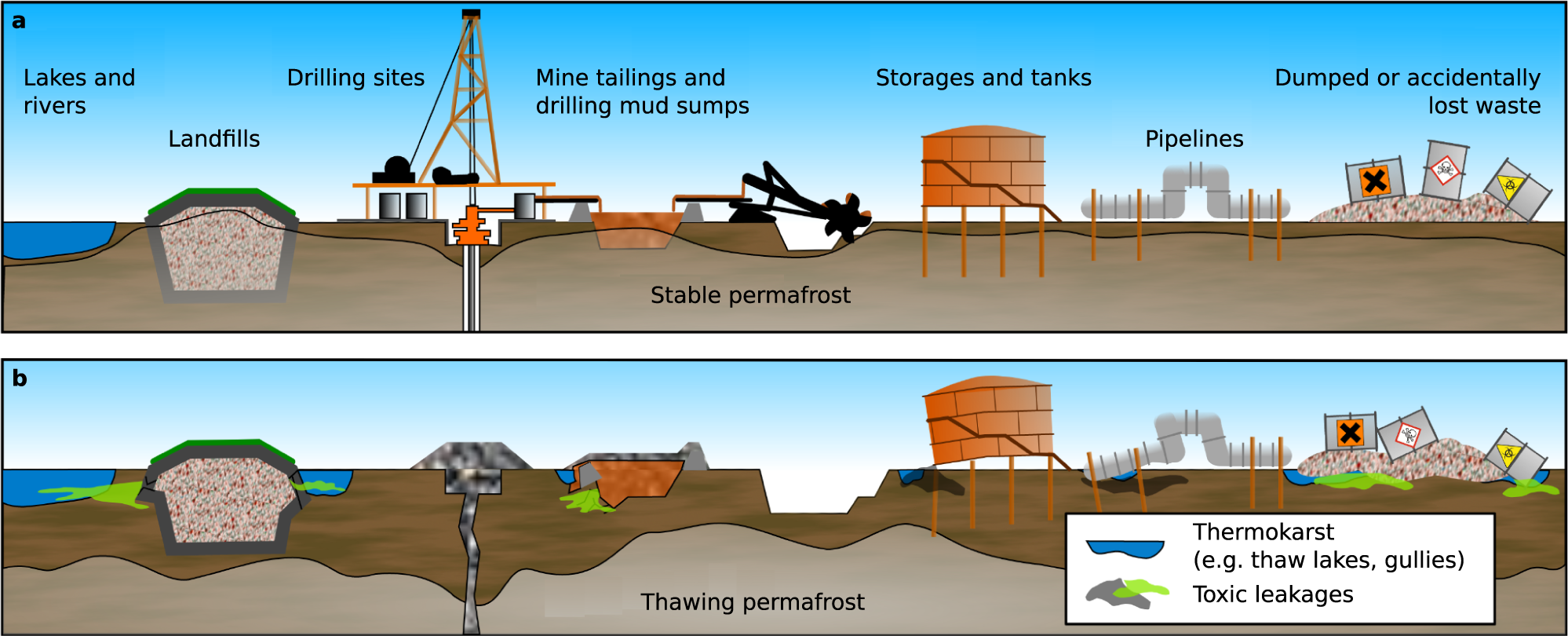
Graphical representation of leaks from various toxic hazards caused by the thaw of formerly stable permafrost.

For much of the 20th century, it was believed that permafrost would "indefinitely" preserve anything buried there, and this made deep permafrost areas popular locations for hazardous waste disposal. In places like Alaska's Prudhoe Bay oil field, procedures were developed documenting the "appropriate" way to inject waste beneath the permafrost. This means that as of 2023, there are ~4500 industrial facilities in the Arctic permafrost areas which either actively process or store hazardous chemicals. Additionally, there are between 13,000 and 20,000 sites which have been heavily contaminated, 70% of them in Russia, and their pollution is currently trapped in the permafrost.

About a fifth of both the industrial and the polluted sites (1000 and 2200–4800) are expected to start thawing in the future even if the warming does not increase from its 2020 levels. Only about 3% more sites would start thawing between now and 2050 under the climate change scenario consistent with the Paris Agreement goals, RCP2.6, but by 2100, about 1100 more industrial facilities and 3500 to 5200 contaminated sites are expected to start thawing even then. Under the very high emission scenario RCP8.5, 46% of industrial and contaminated sites would start thawing by 2050, and virtually all of them would be affected by the thaw by 2100.

Organochlorines and other persistent organic pollutants are of a particular concern, due to their potential to repeatedly reach local communities after their re-release through biomagnification in fish. At worst, future generations born in the Arctic would enter life with weakened immune systems due to pollutants accumulating across generations.

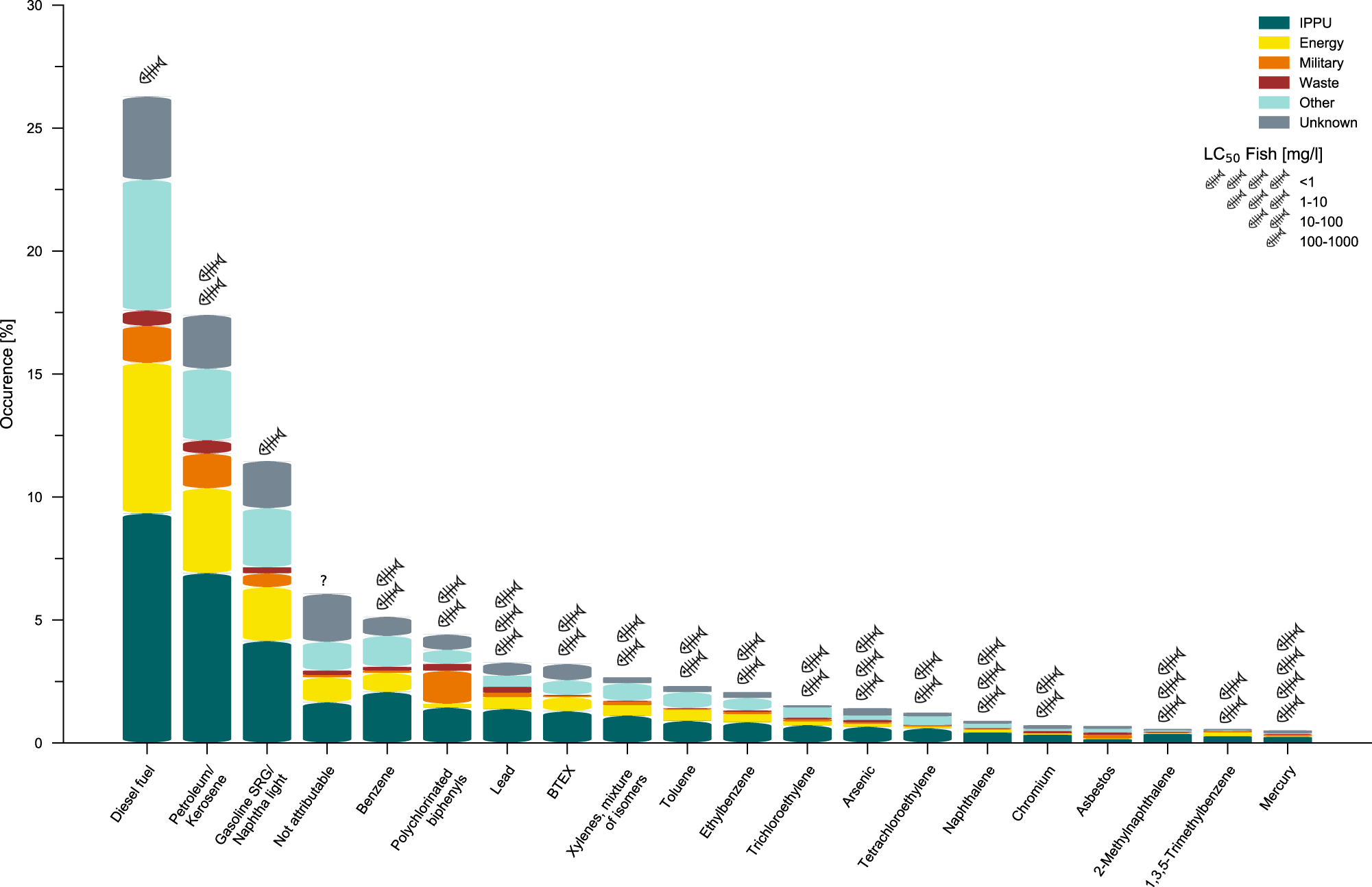
Distribution of toxic substances currently located at various permafrost sites in Alaska, by sector. The number of fish skeletons represents the toxicity of each substance.

A notable example of pollution risks associated with permafrost was the 2020 Norilsk oil spill, caused by the collapse of diesel fuel storage tank at Norilsk-Taimyr Energy's thermal power plant No. 3. It spilled 6,000 tonnes of fuel into the land and 15,000 into the water, polluting Ambarnaya, Daldykan and many smaller rivers on Taimyr Peninsula, even reaching lake Pyasino, which is a crucial water source in the area. State of emergency at the federal level was declared. The event has been described as the second-largest oil spill in modern Russian history.

Another issue associated with permafrost thaw is the release of natural mercury deposits. An estimated 800,000 tons of mercury are frozen in the permafrost soil. According to observations, around 70% of it is simply taken up by vegetation after the thaw. However, if the warming continues under RCP8.5, then permafrost emissions of mercury into the atmosphere would match the current global emissions from all human activities by 2200. Mercury-rich soils also pose a much greater threat to humans and the environment if they thaw near rivers. Under RCP8.5, enough mercury will enter the Yukon River basin by 2050 to make its fish unsafe to eat under the EPA guidelines. By 2100, mercury concentrations in the river will double. Contrastingly, even if mitigation is limited to RCP4.5 scenario, mercury levels will increase by about 14% by 2100, and will not breach the EPA guidelines even by 2300.

The impact of meltwater from Greenland goes beyond nutrient transport. For instance, meltwater also contains dissolved organic carbon, which comes from the microbial activity on the ice sheet's surface, and, to a lesser extent, from the remnants of ancient soil and vegetation beneath the ice. There is about 0.5-27 billion tonnes of pure carbon underneath the entire ice sheet, and much less within it. This is much less than the 1400–1650 billion tonnes contained within the Arctic permafrost, or the annual anthropogenic emissions of around 40 billion tonnes of CO_{2}.) Yet, the release of this carbon through meltwater can still act as a climate change feedback if it increases overall carbon dioxide emissions.

=== Impacts on indigenous peoples ===
As climate change speeds up, it is having more and more of a direct impact on societies around the world. This is particularly true of people that live in the Arctic, where increases in temperature are occurring at faster rates than at other latitudes in the world, and where traditional ways of living, deeply connected with the natural arctic environment are at particular risk of environmental disruption caused by these changes.

The warming of the atmosphere and ecological changes that come alongside it presents challenges to local communities such as the Inuit. Hunting, which is a major way of survival for some small communities, will be changed with increasing temperatures. The reduction of sea ice will cause certain species populations to decline or even become extinct. Inuit communities are deeply reliant on seal hunting, which is dependent on sea ice flats, where seals are hunted.

Unsuspected changes in river and snow conditions will cause herds of animals, including reindeer, to change migration patterns, calving grounds, and forage availability. In good years, some communities are fully employed by the commercial harvest of certain animals. The harvest of different animals fluctuates each year and with the rise of temperatures it is likely to continue changing and creating issues for Inuit hunters, as unpredictability and disruption of ecological cycles further complicate life in these communities, which already face significant problems, such as Inuit communities being the poorest and most unemployed of North America.

Other forms of transportation in the Arctic have seen negative impacts from the current warming, with some transportation routes and pipelines on land being disrupted by the melting of ice. Many Arctic communities rely on frozen roadways to transport supplies and travel from area to area. The changing landscape and unpredictability of weather is creating new challenges in the Arctic. Researchers have documented historical and current trails created by the Inuit in the Pan Inuit Trails Atlas, finding that the change in sea ice formation and breakup has resulted in changes to the routes of trails created by the Inuit.

== Adaptation ==
=== Research ===
Individual countries within the Arctic zone, Canada, Denmark (Greenland), Finland, Iceland, Norway, Russia, Sweden, and the United States (Alaska) conduct independent research through a variety of organizations and agencies, public and private, such as Russia's Arctic and Antarctic Research Institute. Countries who do not have Arctic claims, but are close neighbors, conduct Arctic research as well, such as the Chinese Arctic and Antarctic Administration (CAA). The United States's National Oceanic and Atmospheric Administration (NOAA) produces an Arctic Report Card annually, containing peer-reviewed information on recent observations of environmental conditions in the Arctic relative to historical records. International cooperative research between nations has also become increasingly important:

- Arctic climate change is summarized by the Intergovernmental Panel on Climate Change (IPCC) in its series of Assessment Reports and the Arctic Climate Impact Assessment.
- European Space Agency (ESA) launched CryoSat-2 on 8 April 2010. It provides satellite data on Arctic ice cover change rates.
- International Arctic Buoy Program: deploys and maintains buoys that provide real-time position, pressure, temperature, and interpolated ice velocity data
- International Arctic Research Center: Main participants are the United States and Japan.
- International Arctic Science Committee: non-governmental organization (NGO) with diverse membership, including 23 countries from 3 continents.
- 'Role of the Arctic Region', in conjunction with the International Polar Year, was the focus of the second international conference on Global Change Research, held in Nynäshamn, Sweden, October 2007.
- SEARCH (Study of Environmental Arctic Change): A research framework originally promoted by several US agencies; an international extension is ISAC (the International Study of Arctic Change).

The 2021 Arctic Monitoring and Assessment Programme (AMAP) report by an international team of more than 60 experts, scientists, and indigenous knowledge keepers from Arctic communities, was prepared from 2019 to 2021. It is a follow-up report of the 2017 assessment, "Snow, Water, Ice and Permafrost in the Arctic" (SWIPA). The 2021 IPCC AR6 WG1 Technical Report confirmed that "[o]bserved and projected warming" were ""strongest in the Arctic". According to an 11 August 2022 article published in Nature, there have been numerous reports that the Arctic is warming from twice to three times as fast as the global average since 1979, but the co-authors cautioned that the recent report of the "four-fold Arctic warming ratio" was potentially an "extremely unlikely event". The annual mean Arctic Amplification (AA) index had "reached values exceeding four" from c. 2002 through 2022, according to a July 2022 article in Geophysical Research Letters.

The 14 December 2021 16th Arctic Report Card produced by the United States's National Oceanic and Atmospheric Administration (NOAA) and released annually, examined the "interconnected physical, ecological and human components" of the circumpolar Arctic. The report said that the 12 months between October 2020 and September 2021 were the "seventh warmest over Arctic land since the record began in 1900". The 2017 report said that the melting ice in the warming Arctic was unprecedented in the past 1500 years. NOAA's State of the Arctic Reports, starting in 2006, updates some of the records of the original 2004 and 2005 Arctic Climate Impact Assessment (ACIA) reports by the intergovernmental Arctic Council and the non-governmental International Arctic Science Committee.

A 2022 United Nations Environment Programme (UNEP) report "Spreading Like Wildfire: The Rising Threat Of Extraordinary Landscape Fires" said that smoke from wildfires around the world created a positive feedback loop that is a contributing factor to Arctic melting. The 2020 Siberian heatwave was "associated with extensive burning in the Arctic Circle". Report authors said that this extreme heat event was the first to demonstrate that it would have been "almost impossible" without anthropogenic emissions and climate change.

== See also ==
- Arctic cooperation and politics
- Arctic haze
- Arctic sea ice ecology and history
- Atlantification of the Arctic
- Atmospheric Brown Cloud
- Climate of the Arctic
- Climate and vegetation interactions in the Arctic
- Northern Sea Route
- Climate change in Antarctica
- Ozone depletion and climate change
- Save the Arctic
