= Scott Polar Research Institute =

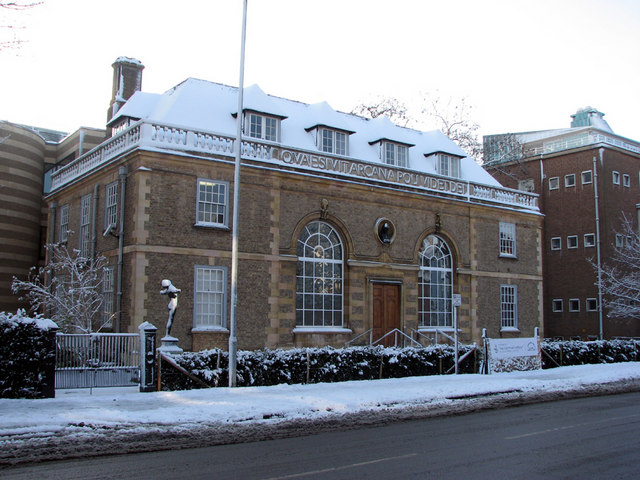
- Established: 1920; 106 years ago
- Director: Professor Richard Powell
- Location: Cambridge, United Kingdom; 52°11′54.40″N 0°07′34.45″E
- Website: www.spri.cam.ac.uk

The Scott Polar Research Institute (SPRI) is a centre for research into the polar regions and glaciology worldwide. It is a sub-department of the Department of Geography in the University of Cambridge, located on Lensfield Road in the south of Cambridge.

SPRI was founded by Frank Debenham in 1920 as the national memorial to Captain Robert Falcon Scott and his companions, who died on their return journey from the South Pole in 1912. It investigates issues relevant to the Arctic and Antarctic in the environmental sciences, social sciences and humanities. The institute is home to the Polar Museum and has some 60 personnel, consisting of academic, library and support staff plus postgraduate students, associates and fellows attached to research programmes. The institute also hosts the Scientific Committee on Antarctic Research.

== Research ==
SPRI has several research groups. Notable researchers that have been based at the institute include Julian Dowdeswell, British diplomat Bryan Roberts, and glaciologist Elizabeth Morris.

=== Glaciology and Climate Change Group ===
This group's work involves quantifying the state of the cryosphere using remote sensing by satellites, plus accurate field measurements and computer simulations, to understand the processes in detail. In particular, the group has been able to observe the melting of the Larsen Ice Shelf, the rapid retreat of ice in western Antarctica, and increased summer melting in northern Canada. This work has contributed greatly to understanding climate change.

=== Glacimarine Environments Group ===
This group's work focuses on the dynamics of ice-sheets and delivery of sediment to the marine environment. The group uses geophysical and geological evidence gathered by icebreakers in the polar seas.

=== Polar Landscape and Remote Sensing Group ===
This group's work focuses on the processes which modify the polar and sub-polar environments, such as Arctic vegetation, and snow and ice cover. Improving techniques for measuring vegetation from satellite data is an important part of the work.

=== Polar Social Science and Humanities Group ===
This is an interdisciplinary group covering the anthropology, history and art of the Arctic. Its work includes looking at politics and environmental management in the polar regions, with particular expertise in the religion, culture and politics of the Russian North.

== The Polar Museum ==
The Polar Museum
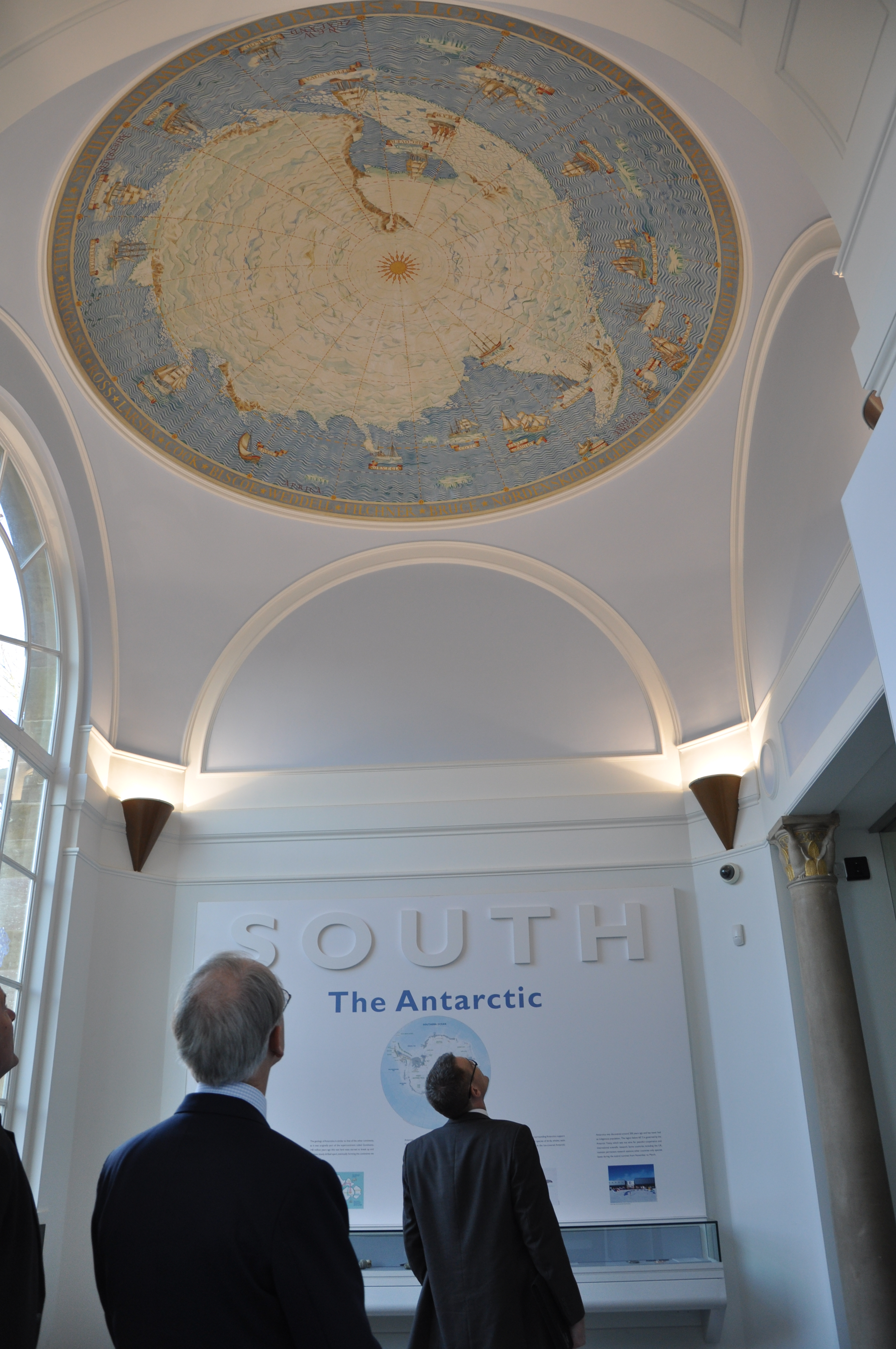
- The Polar Museum, Scott Polar Research Institute
- Type: University Museum
- Accreditation: Arts Council England accredited
- Collections: Objects, art, archive and picture library holdings related to polar research and exploration
- Visitors: 51,469 (2019)
- Director: Professor Richard Powell
- Curator: Dr David Waterhouse
- Architect: Sir Herbert Baker
- Owner: University of Cambridge

University of Cambridge Museums
- Fitzwilliam Museum; Kettle's Yard; Museum of Archaeology and Anthropology; Museum of Classical Archaeology; Whipple Museum of the History of Science; Sedgwick Museum of Earth Sciences; The Polar Museum; Museum of Zoology

SPRI operates the Polar Museum, which presents a range of objects, artworks, documents and photographs from the institute's extensive polar collections. The collections include material related to polar history, exploration, science, art and Arctic cultures.

In 2010 the renovated Polar Museum opened its doors to the public; the reopening was met with widespread acclaim and the museum was shortlisted for the Art Fund's Museum of the Year prize in 2011. It contains displays of Arctic art and artefacts, material from the nineteenth-century search for the elusive Northwest Passage, relics from the Heroic Age of Antarctic Exploration (including the last letters of Captain Scott), and contemporary research and policy relating to the polar regions.

As well as permanent exhibits, the museum regularly hosts special exhibitions. The museum is open Tuesdays to Saturdays, 10:00 – 16:00. Admission is free.

The museum is one of the eight museums and botanic garden which make up the University of Cambridge Museums consortium.

=== Key objects in the Polar Museum collection ===
Important material representing a wide of range of people concerned with the polar regions is cared for by the Scott Polar Research Institute and on display in the Polar Museum includes:

- A folding camera used by Robert Falcon Scott at the South Pole, 1912, on the British Antarctic Expedition 1910–13 (Terra Nova).
- A reindeer-skin sleeping bag used by Captain Lawrence Oates during the journey to the South Pole on the British Antarctic Expedition 1910–13 (Terra Nova). The bag was found on 12 November 1912 by the search party looking for the polar party.
- A sextant used for navigation by Captain Frank Worsley on the James Caird during Ernest Shackleton's Imperial Trans-Antarctic Expedition 1914–16 (Endurance).

=== Key artists represented in the Polar Museum collections ===
The wide-ranging collections include art and photographic works by several notable artists and photographers, including:

- Herbert Ponting
- Kenojuak Ashevak
- Kathleen Scott
- Edward Adrian Wilson
- Isobel Wylie Hutchison
- Sidney Nolan
- Frank Hurley
- Pudlo Pudlat

The institute is actively adding to its collection of contemporary polar art through its artist in residence scheme, managed by the Friends of SPRI, which enables an artist to travel to the Antarctic and the Arctic each year. Artists include Emma Stibbon, Lucy Carty, Kat Austen and Shelly Perkins.

== Library and collections ==
The Scott Polar Research Institute houses the world's most comprehensive polar library and archives. The institute's Thomas H. Manning Archive contains an unparalleled collection of manuscript material relating to research in and exploration of the polar regions, For scientists and scholars, the library offers a collection developed since the 1920s covering all subjects relating to the Arctic, the Antarctic, and to ice and snow wherever found. For industry, it is a prime information source on such subjects as exploration and exploitation of natural resources and on the environmental implications of such activities in the polar regions; on the design of ice-strengthened shipping and selection of sea routes; and on problems of construction and transportation in cold environments. The library also offers an unrivalled resource for the needs of international relations and strategic defence.

The Picture Library contains a photograph collection from both the Arctic and Antarctic, mainly depicting the history of exploration in the polar regions, including much material from the expeditions of Scott and Shackleton. The Thomas H. Manning Polar Archives are named in honour of the British-Canadian Arctic researcher, a university alumnus. Its work includes an oral history programme which interviews people who have worked in the polar regions over the years. Due to high demand, the Polar Archives runs a booking scheme for anyone wishing to consult material.

The most recent addition to the library is the Shackleton Memorial Library, which in 1999 won a regional award from the Royal Institute of British Architects. This part of the building holds much of the library's Antarctic collection, as well as some of its subject-based material.

The library is an active member of the Polar Libraries Colloquy, an international organization of Librarians and others concerned with the collection, preservation, and dissemination of information dealing with the Arctic and Antarctic regions. The library is open to anyone with a polar interest for reference work and research.

== History ==
While climbing Mount Erebus in November 1912 as part of Robert Falcon Scott's ill-fated Terra Nova expedition, Frank Debenham came up with the idea of a polar research institute. After the end of World War I, he co-founded the institute with Raymond Priestley and was its first director.

The Grade II listed main building (1933–1934) is by Sir Herbert Baker. The small halls have shallow domed ceilings painted with the aspect of the globe from north and south poles, by MacDonald Gill. The small gardens are home to a range of sculptures and historic artefacts relating to the polar regions.

=== Directors ===
- 1920–1946: Frank Debenham
- 1946–1949 (part-time): Launcelot Fleming
- 1949–1956: Colin Bertram
- 1958–1982: Gordon de Quetteville Robin
- 1982–1983: Terence Armstrong
- 1984–1987: David Drewry
- 1987–1992: Peter Wadhams
- 1992–1998: John Heap
- 1998–2002: Keith Richards
- 2002–2021: Julian A. Dowdeswell
- 2021–2024: Neil Arnold
- 2024–: Richard Powell

== See also ==
- Scott Polar Research Institute's journal Polar Record
- British Antarctic Survey
- World Data Center
- National Snow and Ice Data Center
- Scientific Committee on Antarctic Research
- Pan Inuit Trails Atlas
