= Cloud feedback =

Feedback between climate change and the effect of clouds on radiation

Clouds affect the amount of reflected shortwave and emitted longwave radiation, which in turn affects global temperature. Changes in global temperature can then cause changes to clouds. The overall interaction can lead to a feedback.

A cloud feedback is a climate change feedback where some aspects of cloud characteristics (e.g. cloud cover, composition or height) are altered due to climate change, and these changes then further affect the Earth's energy balance. On their own, clouds are already an important part of the climate system, as they consist of liquid droplets and ice particles, which absorb infrared radiation and reflect visible solar radiation. Clouds at low altitudes have a stronger cooling effect, and those at high altitudes have a stronger warming effect. Altogether, clouds make the Earth cooler than it would have been without them.

If climate change causes low-level cloud cover to become more widespread, then these clouds will increase planetary albedo and contribute to cooling, making the overall cloud feedback negative (one that slows down the warming). Vice versa, if they change in such a way that their warming effect increases relative to their cooling effect then the net cloud feedback, then the net cloud feedback will be positive and accelerate the warming, as clouds will be less reflective and trap more heat in the atmosphere.

There are many mechanisms by which cloud feedbacks occur. Most substantially, evidence points to climate change causing high clouds to rise in altitude (a positive feedback), the coverage of tropical low clouds to reduce (a positive feedback) and polar low clouds to become more reflective (a negative feedback). Aside from cloud responses to human-induced warming through greenhouse gases, the interaction of clouds with aerosol particles is known to affect cloud reflectivity, and may modulate the strength of cloud feedbacks. Cloud feedback processes have been represented in every major climate model from the 1980s onwards. Observations and climate model results now provide high confidence that the overall cloud feedback on climate change is positive.

Cloud feedbacks are estimated using both observational data and climate models. Uncertainty in both these aspects - for example, incomplete observational data or uncertainty in the representation of processes in models mean that cloud feedback estimates differ substantially between models. Thus, models can simulate cloud feedback as very positive or only weakly positive, and these disagreements are the main reason why climate models can have substantial differences in transient climate response and climate sensitivity. In particular, a minority of the Coupled Model Intercomparison Project Phase 6 (CMIP6) models have made headlines before the publication of the IPCC Sixth Assessment Report (AR6) due to their high estimates of equilibrium climate sensitivity (ECS). This had occurred because they estimated cloud feedback as highly positive. Although those particular models were soon found to contradict both observations and paleoclimate evidence, it is suggested to be problematic if ruling out these 'hot' models solely based on ECS and care should be taken when weighting climate model ensembles by temperature alone.

One reason why constraining cloud feedbacks has been difficult is because humans affect clouds in another major way besides the warming from greenhouse gases. Small atmospheric sulfate particles, or aerosols, are generated due to the same sulfur-heavy air pollution which also causes acid rain, but they are also very reflective, to the point their concentrations in the atmosphere cause reductions in visible sunlight known as global dimming. These particles affect the clouds in multiple ways, mostly making them more reflective through aerosol-cloud interactions. This means that changes in clouds caused by aerosols can be confused for an evidence of negative cloud feedback, and separating the two effects has been difficult.

== How clouds affect radiation and climate feedback ==
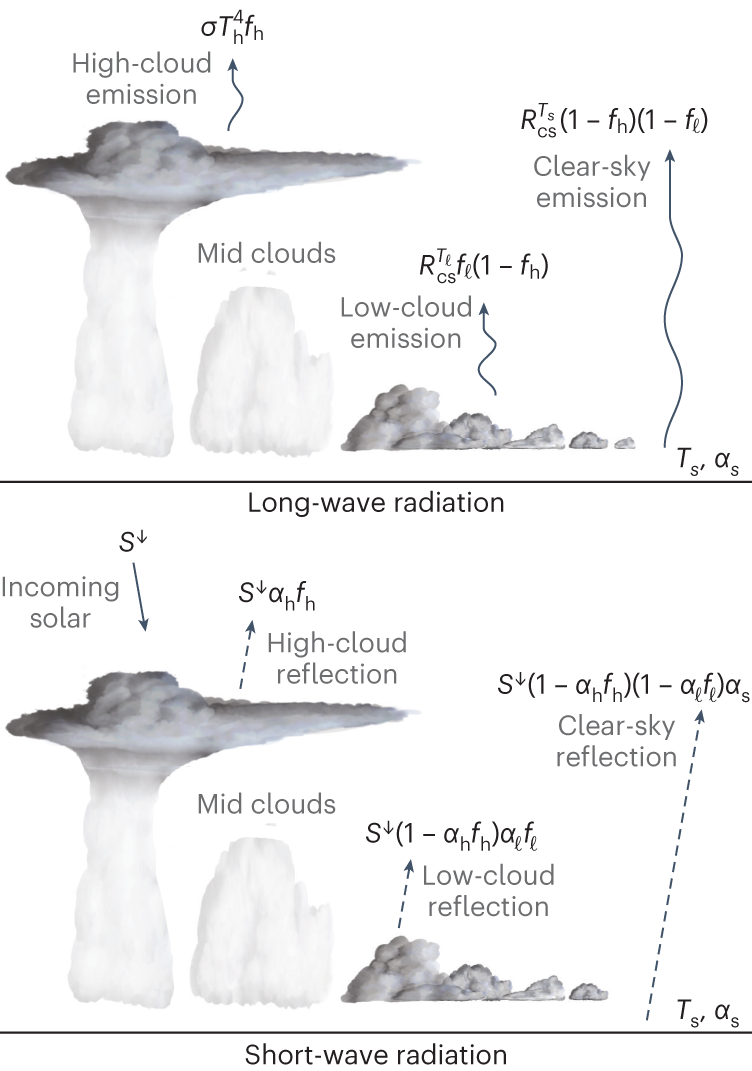
Details of how clouds interact with shortwave and longwave radiation at different atmospheric heights

Clouds have two major effects on the Earth's energy budget. Firstly, they reflect shortwave radiation from sunlight back to space due to their high albedo - a cooling effect for the Earth. Secondly, the condensed and frozen water contained inside them absorbs longwave radiation emitted by the Earth's surface. Clouds themselves also emit longwave radiation, both towards the surface and to space. Clouds are usually colder than the surface, so that they emit less energy upward. The net longwave effect is that the presence of clouds reduces the radiation emitted to space, i.e. a warming effect.

In meteorology, the difference in the radiation budget caused by clouds, relative to cloud-free conditions, is described as the cloud radiative effect (CRE). This is also sometimes referred to as cloud radiative forcing (CRF). However, since cloud changes are not normally considered an external forcing of climate, CRE is the most commonly used term.

This can be described by the equation

$CRE = R_{all-sky} - R_{clear-sky}$

Where CRE is cloud radiative effect (W m^{−2}), R_{all-sky} is the radiation flux (W m^{−2}) under actual sky conditions, and R_{clear-sky} is a hypothetical radiation flux (W m^{−2}) computed for the identical temperature and moisture conditions but omitting the optical effects of clouds.

Cloud feedback is one of a number of climate feedbacks. Cloud feedback sums up the influence of all aspects of the cloud field on radiation, weighted by the sensitivity of each aspect to global average temperature change. In equation form,

$\lambda_{cloud} = \Sigma \frac{\partial N}{\partial x_{cloud}} \frac{\partial x_{cloud}}{\partial T}$

where N is the Earth's net radiation (W m^{−2}), $x_{cloud}$ is the change in some aspect or characteristic of cloudiness (e.g. cloud cover, thickness, particle sizes, height), and T is the global mean near-surface air temperature (K).

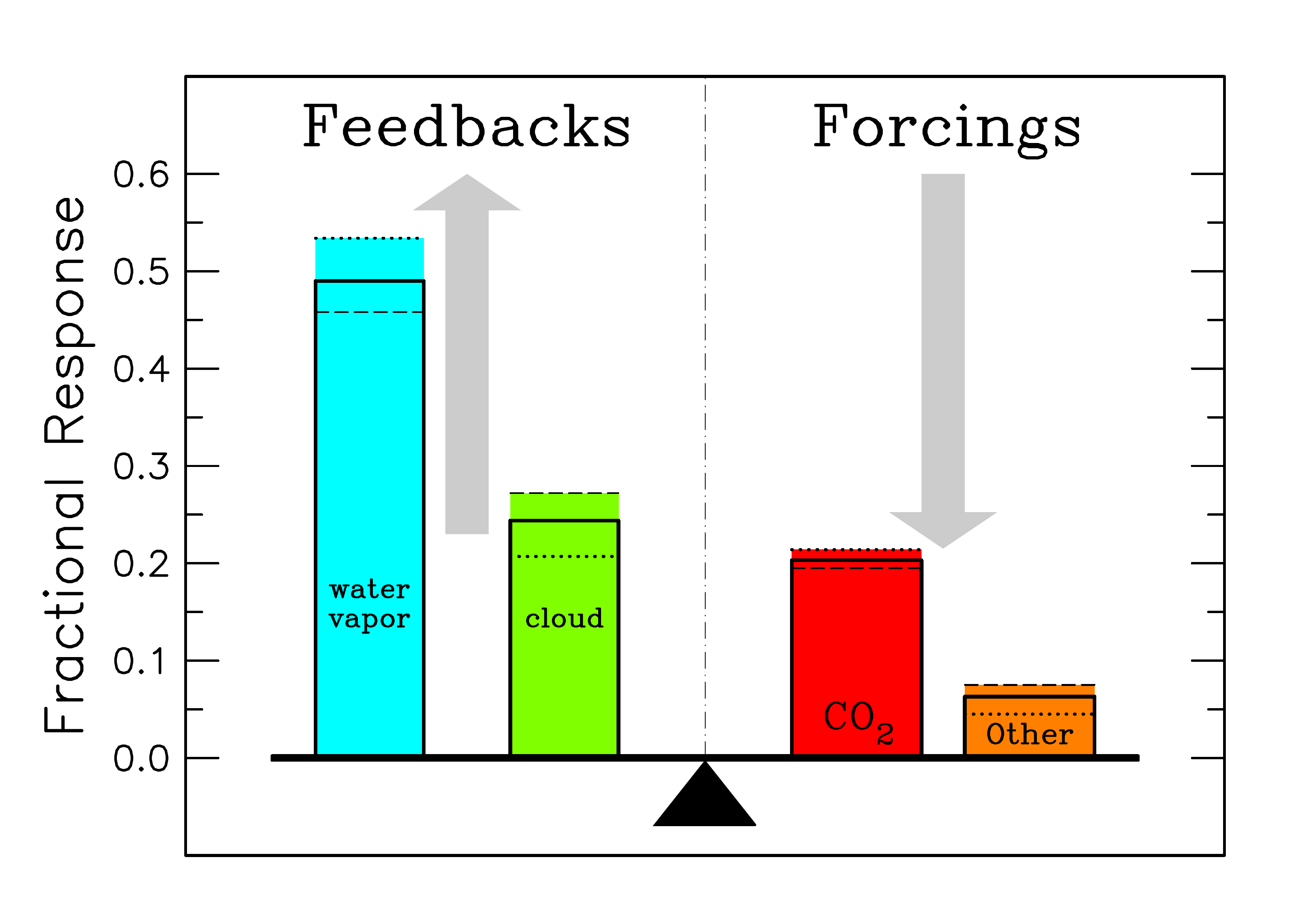
Attribution of individual atmospheric component contributions to the greenhouse effect, separated into feedback and forcing categories (NASA)

On a hypothetical cloud-free Earth, water vapor would contribute 67% and CO_{2} 24% of the greenhouse effect keeping the planet warmer than it would be without an atmosphere. In actual (all-sky) conditions, clouds contribute 25%, and their screening effect lowers the vapor and CO_{2} contributions to 50% and 19% respectively. According to 1990 estimates, the presence of clouds reduces the outgoing longwave radiation by about 31 W/m^{2}. However, it also increases the global albedo from 15% to 30%, and this reduces the amount of solar radiation absorbed by the Earth by about 44 W/m^{2}. Thus, the observed global population of clouds contributes a net cooling of about 13 W/m^{2}. If all clouds were removed with all else remaining the same, the Earth would lose this much cooling and the global temperatures would increase.

Climate change increases the amount of water vapor in the atmosphere due to the Clausius–Clapeyron relation, in what is known as the water-vapor feedback. It also affects a range of cloud properties, such as their height, the typical distribution throughout the atmosphere, and cloud microphysics, such as the amount of water droplets held, all of which then affect clouds' radiative forcing. Differences in those properties change the role of clouds in the Earth's energy budget. The name cloud feedback refers to this relationship between climate change, cloud properties, and clouds' radiative forcing. Clouds also affect the magnitude of internally generated climate variability.

== Cloud feedback mechanisms ==
=== Low clouds ===
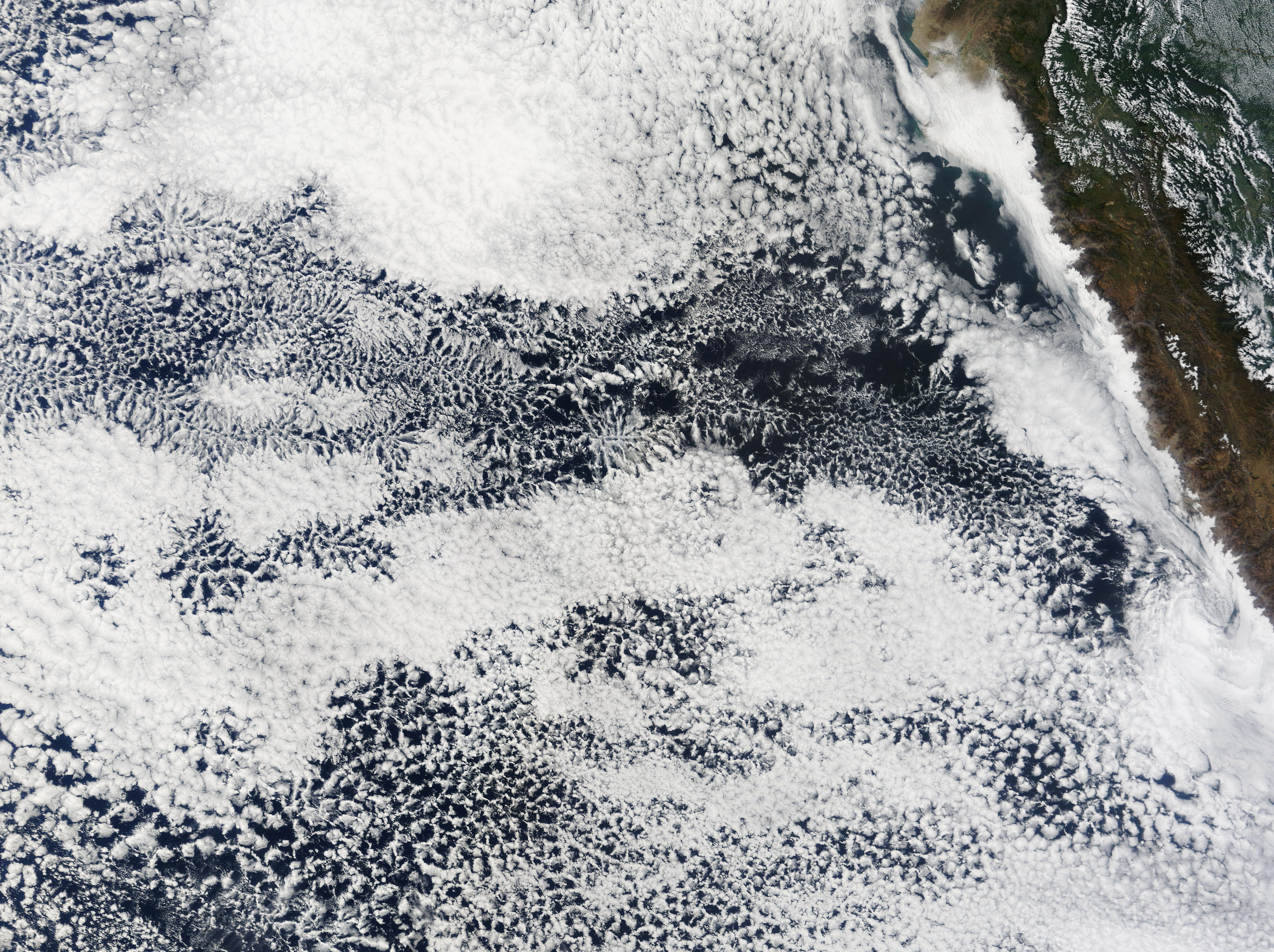
Stratocumulus clouds off Peru

Low clouds include the cumulus, stratocumulus and stratus cloud types. Scientifically they tend to be defined as those clouds with cloud top pressure higher than 680 hPa, according the to International Satellite Cloud Climatology Project. The feedback of low clouds primarily arises from effects on shortwave radiation.

==== Tropical marine low-cloud feedback ====
Multiple lines of evidence, including global climate models, observations and high resolution process modelling, agree that the tropical low cloud amount is likely to decrease, which corresponds to a positive feedback.

==== Possible break-up of equatorial stratocumulus clouds ====
In 2019, a study employed a large eddy simulation model to estimate that equatorial stratocumulus clouds could break up and scatter when CO_{2} levels rise above 1,200 ppm (almost three times higher than the current levels, and over 4 times greater than the preindustrial levels). The study estimated that this would cause a surface warming of about 8 °C (14 °F) globally and 10 °C (18 °F) in the subtropics, which would be in addition to at least 4 °C (7.2 °F) already caused by such CO_{2} concentrations. Stratocumulus clouds would not reform until the CO_{2} concentrations drop to a much lower level.

It was suggested that this finding could help explain past episodes of unusually rapid warming such as Paleocene-Eocene Thermal Maximum. In 2020, further work from the same authors revealed that in their large eddy simulation, this tipping point cannot be stopped with solar radiation modification: in a hypothetical scenario where very high CO_{2} emissions continue for a long time but are offset with extensive solar radiation modification, the break-up of stratocumulus clouds is simply delayed until CO_{2} concentrations hit 1,700 ppm, at which point it would still cause around 5 °C (9.0 °F) of unavoidable warming.

However, because large eddy simulation models are simpler and smaller-scale than the general circulation models used for climate projections, with limited representation of atmospheric processes like subsidence, this finding is currently considered speculative. Other scientists say that the model used in that study unrealistically extrapolates the behavior of small cloud areas onto all cloud decks, and that it is incapable of simulating anything other than a rapid transition, with some comparing it to "a knob with two settings". Additionally, CO_{2} concentrations would only reach 1,200 ppm if the world follows Representative Concentration Pathway 8.5, which represents the highest possible greenhouse gas emission scenario and involves a massive expansion of coal infrastructure. In that case, 1,200 ppm would be passed shortly after 2100.

==== Mid-latitude marine low-cloud feedback ====
There is both observational and modelling evidence that a positive mid-latitude low-cloud feedback is feasible. In part, such a feedback could arise for similar reasons to the tropical marine low-cloud feedback. In addition, a poleward shift of mid-latitude Storm tracks would reduce the solar radiation interacting with low cloud and result in a positive feedback.

==== High-latitude low-cloud optical depth feedback ====
The optical depth (or opacity) of cloud can increase if the number of cloud particles increases for given water content, or the water content increases. Related to this, a shift from liquid cloud particles to ice cloud particles tends to correspond to a shift from more numerous smaller particles to fewer larger particles, and therefore can decrease optical depth. A number of studies have explored the potential for high-latitude cloud optical depth to contribute to climate feedback. However, there is not clear evidence that a non-zero feedback exists for this cloud type.

Examples of cloud feedback

=== Land clouds ===
Land clouds can include clouds types of differing heights.

Larger warming of land compared to ocean under climate change is expected to lead to reduced cloud cover over land, especially reduced low cloud cover. An increase in atmospheric temperature means that higher water vapour amounts will be needed to reach saturation. Because transport of moisture from the oceans and evaporation from the soil is not expected to increase by as much as the saturation level, the relative humidity of the air is expected to reduce, and therefore reduce the cloud amount. If low clouds reduce more than other clouds then this will result in increased solar absorption at the surface and a positive feedback.

=== High clouds ===
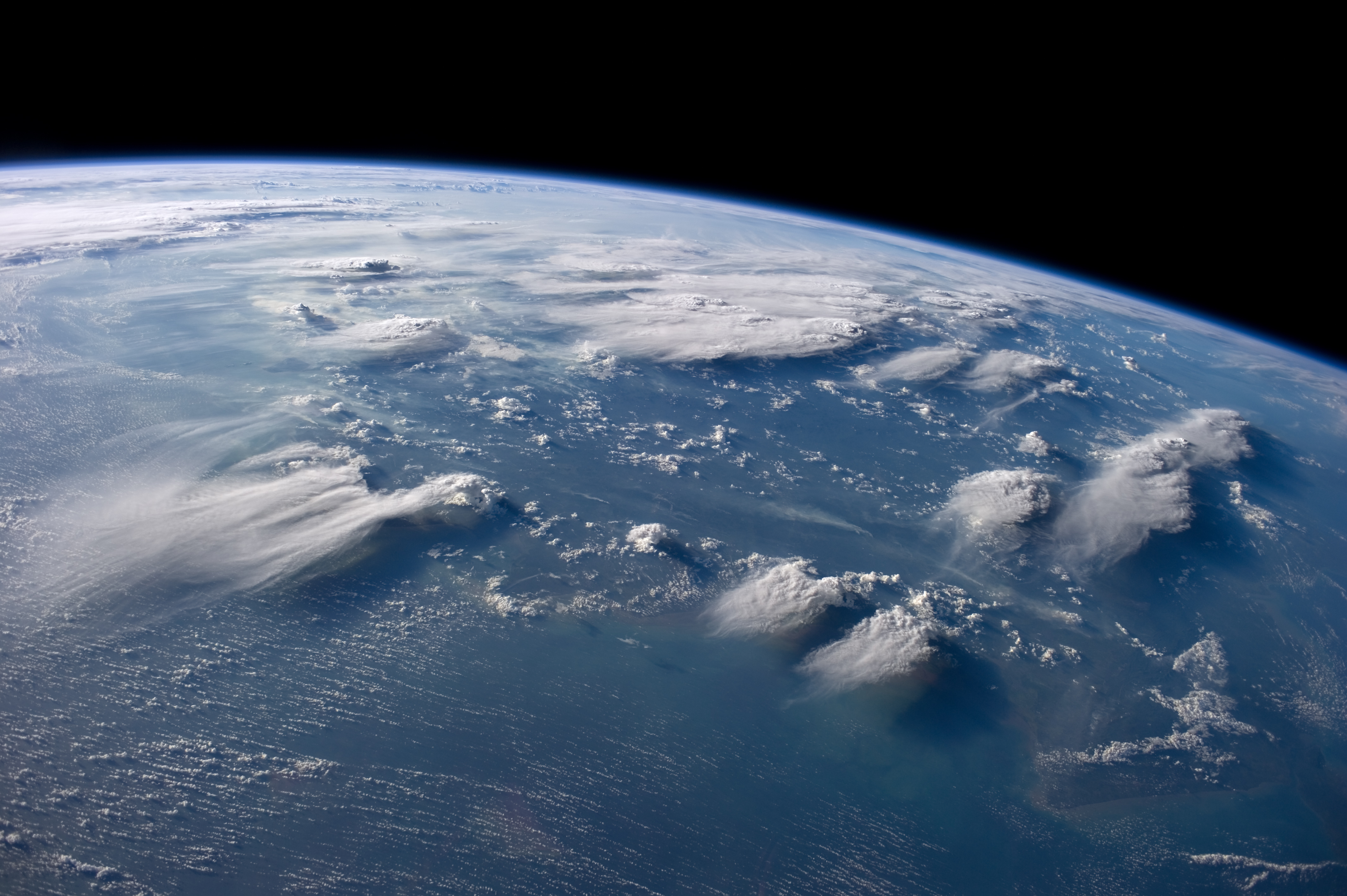
High clouds in the tropics

High clouds include the cirrus, cirrostratus and cumulonimbus cloud types. Scientifically they tend to be defined as those clouds with cloud top pressure lower than 440 hPa.. The focus scientifically also tends to be on tropical ocean high cloud.

Unlike low clouds, whose effect on radiation is primarily in the shortwave, high clouds substantially effect both shortwave and longwave radiation. However, the resultant net radiative effect involves a substantial, though not necessarily complete, cancellation of the two effects in the longwave and shortwave.

For high clouds the feedback is currently positive in total, as the shortwave feedback is near zero and the longwave feedback is positive. It is together with the mid-level cloud feedback a larger contributor to the total cloud feedback than low clouds.

==== High-cloud altitude feedback ====
High clouds are expected to grow to taller heights under climate change. This arises from physical understanding which relates the height of convective cloud to the vertical profile of water vapour in the tropics. Predictions based on theory are broadly confirmed by projections with climate models and high resolution process models. As such, the high-cloud altitude feedback is one of the most clearly established positive cloud feedbacks.

The altitude of the high clouds increases with rising temperatures. Higher temperatures on the surface force the moisture to rise, which is fundamentally described by the Clausius Clapeyron equation. The altitude at which the radiative cooling is still effective is closely tied to the humidity and rises equally. The altitude, at which the radiative cooling becomes inefficient due to a lack of moisture, then determines the detrainment height of deep convection due to the mass conservation. The cloud top height therefore strongly depends on the surface temperature.

There are three theories on how the altitude and thus temperature depends on surface warming. The FAT (Fixed Anvil Temperature) hypothesis argues, that the isotherms shift upwards with global warming and the temperature at the cloud top stays therefore constant. This results in a positive feedback, since no more radiation is emitted while the surface temperature is rising. According to the FAT hypothesis this leads to a feedback of 0,27 W m$^{-2}$ K$^{-1}$. The second hypothesis called PHAT (Proportionally Higher Anvil Temperature) claims a smaller cloud feedback of 0.20 W m$^{-2}$ K$^{-1}$, due to a slight warming of the cloud tops which agrees better with observations. The static stability increases with higher surface temperatures in the upper troposphere and lets the clouds shift slightly to warmer temperatures. The third hypothesis is FAP (Fixed Anvil Pressure) which assumes a constant cloud top pressure with a warming climate, as if the cloud top does not move upwards. This results in a negative longwave feedback, which does not agree with observations. It can be used to calculate the impact of the cloud height change on the longwave feedback. Most models agree with the PHAT hypothesis which also agrees the most with observations.

==== Tropical high cloud area feedback ====
It is broadly expected that high cloud amount originisting from deep convection will reduce with warming. Two mechanisms can lead to a decrease in the area fraction a. The warming at the surface decreases the moist adiabat temperature reduction with height which leads to a decrease of the clear sky subsidence. Since the convective mass flux has to be equal to the clear sky subsidence it decreases as well and with it potentially the cloud area fraction. Another argument for a smaller area fraction is that the self-aggregation of clouds increases at higher temperatures. This would lead to smaller convective areas and larger dry areas which increase the radiative longwave cooling. Recent work has shown that high cloud not of convective origin may not be so clearly predicted. However, high cloud that follows the broadly understood physical relationships tends to have a negative cloud radiative effect, and therefore a reduction in its amount can produce a small positive feedback.

Some past research has conflated feedback associated with high cloud (also referred to as "anvil cloud") area with feedback associated with high cloud optical depth. More recent studies using independent approaches have used analysis that accurately determines feedback resulting from high cloud amount changes. These studies based on observations, high resolution process models and physical theory conclude that the net tropical high cloud amount feedback is near zero or slightly positive.

==== High cloud optical depth feedback ====
Optical depth (or opacity) or clouds changes is as a result of composition or thickness. It has not been well-studied or distinguished from other forms of high cloud feedback until recently. Observations show high cloud optical depth as having reduced in the last couple of decades. Physical theory has proposed that there is potential for a large feedback in the shortwave component of optical depth (manifesting in cloud albedo). However, process based models show a large uncertainty of the optical depth feedback. The topic remains an active area of research, with cloud microphysical simulation being a major constraint on the ability of existing climate models to provide useful understanding of the optical depth feedback.

==== Challenges ====
It is difficult to detect the reason for a change in the SW and LW radiation due to cloud feedback, because there are a lot of cloud responses which could be the cause for a specific radiation feedback. Furthermore is it difficult to not count in clear sky effects. There are techniques to decompose the cloud feedbacks in models and their triggers in detail by showing the cloud fraction as a function of cloud-top pressure and the optical depth of the cloud. In the GCM, which are mostly used, the main challenge is the parametrization of clouds, especially in coarse-resolution models. The characteristics of clouds need to be parametrized in such a way, that the different feedbacks and physical interactions are as correct as possible in order to decrease the uncertainty of the models.

Another challenge when dealing with (high) cloud feedbacks, is that the LW and SW part often cancel each other out, so that only a small total feedback is left. The positive and negative feedback parts are not neglectable, since they can change independent of one another with rising temperature.

== Representation in climate models ==
Examples of some effects of global warming that can amplify (positive feedbacks) or reduce (negative feedbacks) global warming

Climate models have represented clouds and cloud processes for a very long time. Cloud feedback was already a standard feature in climate models designed in the 1980s. However, the physics of clouds are very complex, so models often represent various types of clouds in different ways, and even small variations between models can lead to significant changes in temperature and precipitation response. Climate scientists devote a lot of effort to resolving this issue. This includes the Cloud Feedback Model Intercomparison Project (CFMIP), where models simulate cloud processes under different conditions and their output is compared with the observational data. (AR6 WG1, Ch1, 223) When the Intergovernmental Panel on Climate Change had published its Sixth Assessment Report (AR6) in 2021, the uncertainty range regarding cloud feedback strength became 50% smaller since the time of the AR5 in 2014.

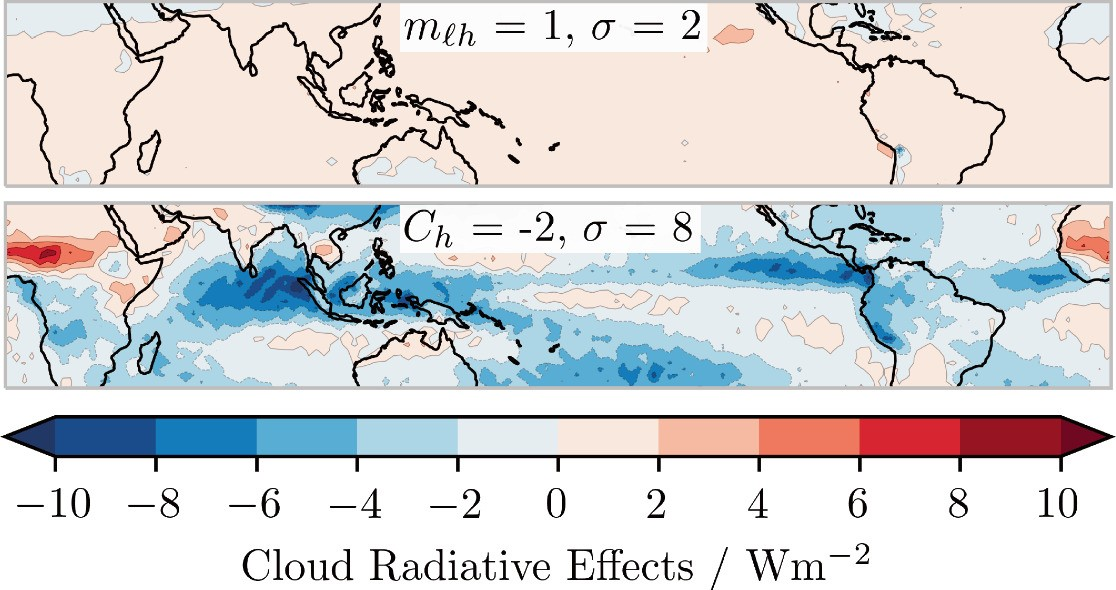
Tropical clouds are known to have a cooling effect, but it is uncertain whether it would become stronger or weaker in the future

Remaining uncertainty about cloud feedbacks in IPCC Sixth Assessment Report
Feedback	Direction	Confidence
High-cloud altitude feedback	Positive	High
Tropical high-cloud amount feedback	Negative	Low
Subtropical marine low-cloud feedback	Positive	High
Land cloud feedback	Positive	Low
Mid-latitude cloud amount feedback	Positive	Medium
Extratropical cloud optical depth feedback	Small negative	Medium
Arctic cloud feedback	Small positive	Low
Net cloud feedback	Positive	High

This happened because of major improvements in the understanding of cloud behaviour over the subtropical oceans. As the result, there was high confidence that the overall cloud feedback is positive (contributes to warming). The AR6 value for cloud feedback is +0.42 [–0.10 to 0.94] W m–2 per every 1 °C (1.8 °F) in warming. This estimate is derived from multiple lines of evidence, including both models and observations. The tropical high-cloud amount feedback is the main remaining area for improvement. The only way total cloud feedback may still be slightly negative is if either this feedback, or the optical depth feedback in the Southern Ocean clouds is suddenly found to be "extremely large"; the probability of that is considered to be below 10%. As of 2024, most recent observations from the CALIPSO satellite instead indicate that the tropical cloud feedback is very weak.

In spite of these improvements, clouds remain the least well-understood climate feedback, and they are the main reason why models estimate differing values for equilibrium climate sensitivity (ECS). ECS is an estimate of long-term (multi-century) warming in response to a doubling in CO_{2}-equivalent greenhouse gas concentrations: if the future emissions are not low, it also becomes the most important factor for determining 21st century temperatures. In general, the current generation of gold-standard climate models, CMIP6, operates with larger climate sensitivity than the previous generation, and this is largely because cloud feedback is about 20% more positive than it was in CMIP5.

However, the median cloud feedback is only slightly larger in CMIP6 than it was in CMIP5; the average is so much higher only because several "hot" models have much stronger cloud feedback and higher sensitivity than the rest. Those models have a sensitivity of 5 °C (41 °F) and their presence had increased the median model sensitivity from 3.2 °C (37.8 °F) in CMIP5 to 3.7 °C (38.7 °F) in CMIP6. These model results had attracted considerable attention when they were first published in 2019, as they would have meant faster and more severe warming if they were accurate. It was soon found that the output of those "hot" models is inconsistent with both observations and paleoclimate evidence, so the consensus AR6 value for cloud feedback is smaller than the mean model output alone. The best estimate of climate sensitivity in AR6 is at 3 °C (37 °F), as this is in a better agreement with observations and paleoclimate findings.

== Role of aerosol and aerosol-cloud interaction ==
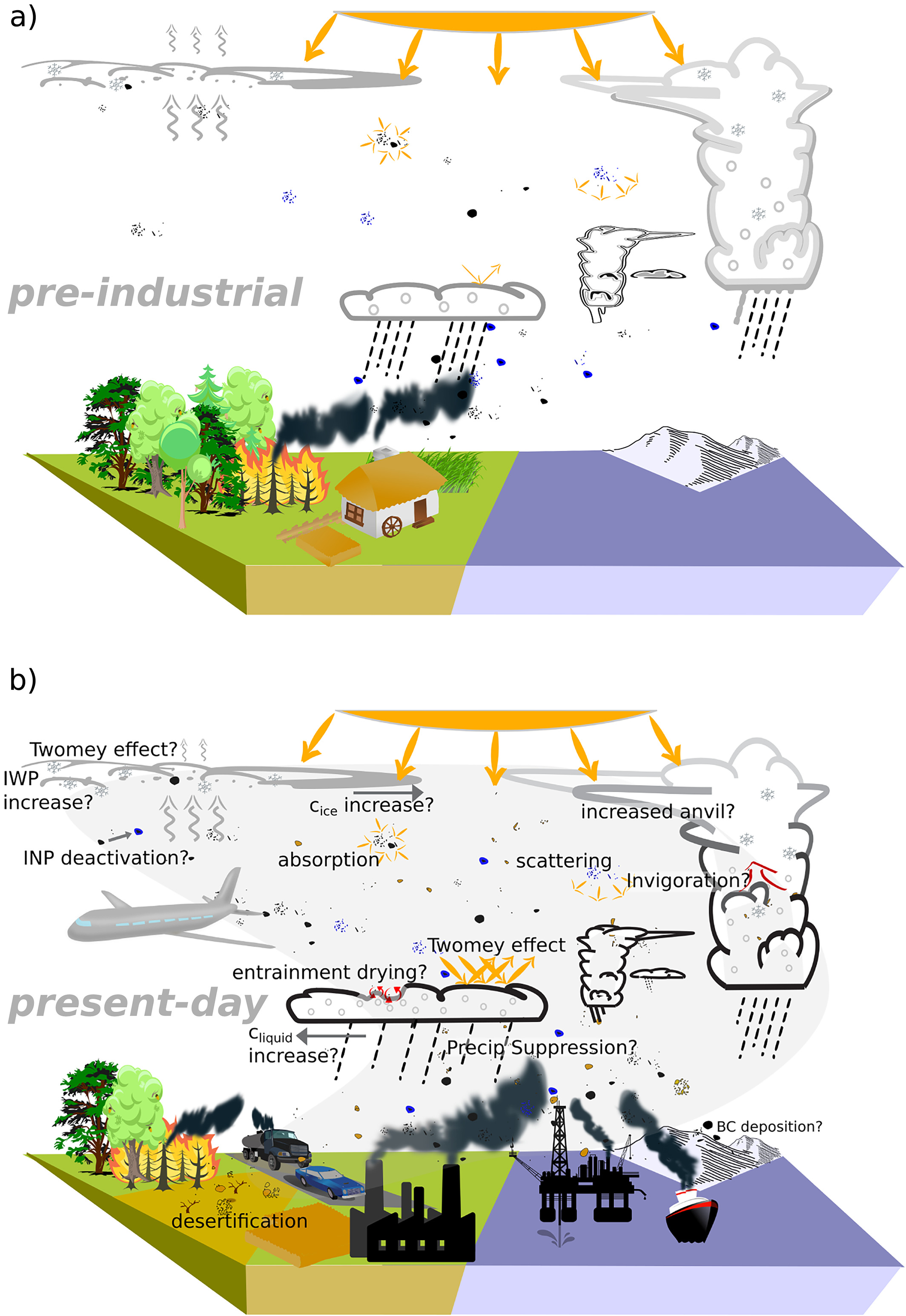
Air pollution, including from large-scale land clearing, has substantially increased the presence of aerosols in the atmosphere when compared to the preindustrial background levels. Different types of particles have different effects, and there is a variety of interactions in different atmospheric layers. Overall, they provide cooling, but complexity makes the exact strength of cooling very difficult to estimate.

Atmospheric aerosols—fine particles suspended in the air—affect cloud formation and properties, which also alters their impact on climate. While some aerosols, such as black carbon particles, make the clouds darker and thus contribute to warming, by far the strongest effect is from sulfates, which increase the number of cloud droplets, making the clouds more reflective, and helping them cool the climate more. These influences of aerosols on clouds are aerosol indirect effects, of which the famous one are the Twomey effect and the Albrecht effect through aerosols acting as cloud condensation nuclei (CCN). Less well understood indirect effects of aerosols are on the formation of ice, through variation in concentrations and types of ice nucleating particles. Aerosols also have an indirect effect on liquid water path, and determining it involves computationally heavy continuous calculations of evaporation and condensation within clouds. Climate models generally assume that aerosols increase liquid water path, which makes the clouds even more reflective. However, satellite observations taken in 2010s suggested that aerosols decreased liquid water path instead, and in 2018, this was reproduced in a model which integrated more complex cloud microphysics. Yet, 2019 research found that earlier satellite observations were biased by failing to account for the thickest, most water-heavy clouds naturally raining more and shedding more particulates: very strong aerosol cooling was seen when comparing clouds of the same thickness.

Moreover, large-scale observations can be confounded by changes in other atmospheric factors, like humidity: i.e. it was found that while post-1980 improvements in air quality would have reduced the number of clouds over the East Coast of the United States by around 20%, this was offset by the increase in relative humidity caused by atmospheric response to AMOC slowdown. Similarly, while the initial research looking at sulfates from the 2014–2015 eruption of Bárðarbunga found that they caused no change in liquid water path, it was later suggested that this finding was confounded by counteracting changes in humidity.

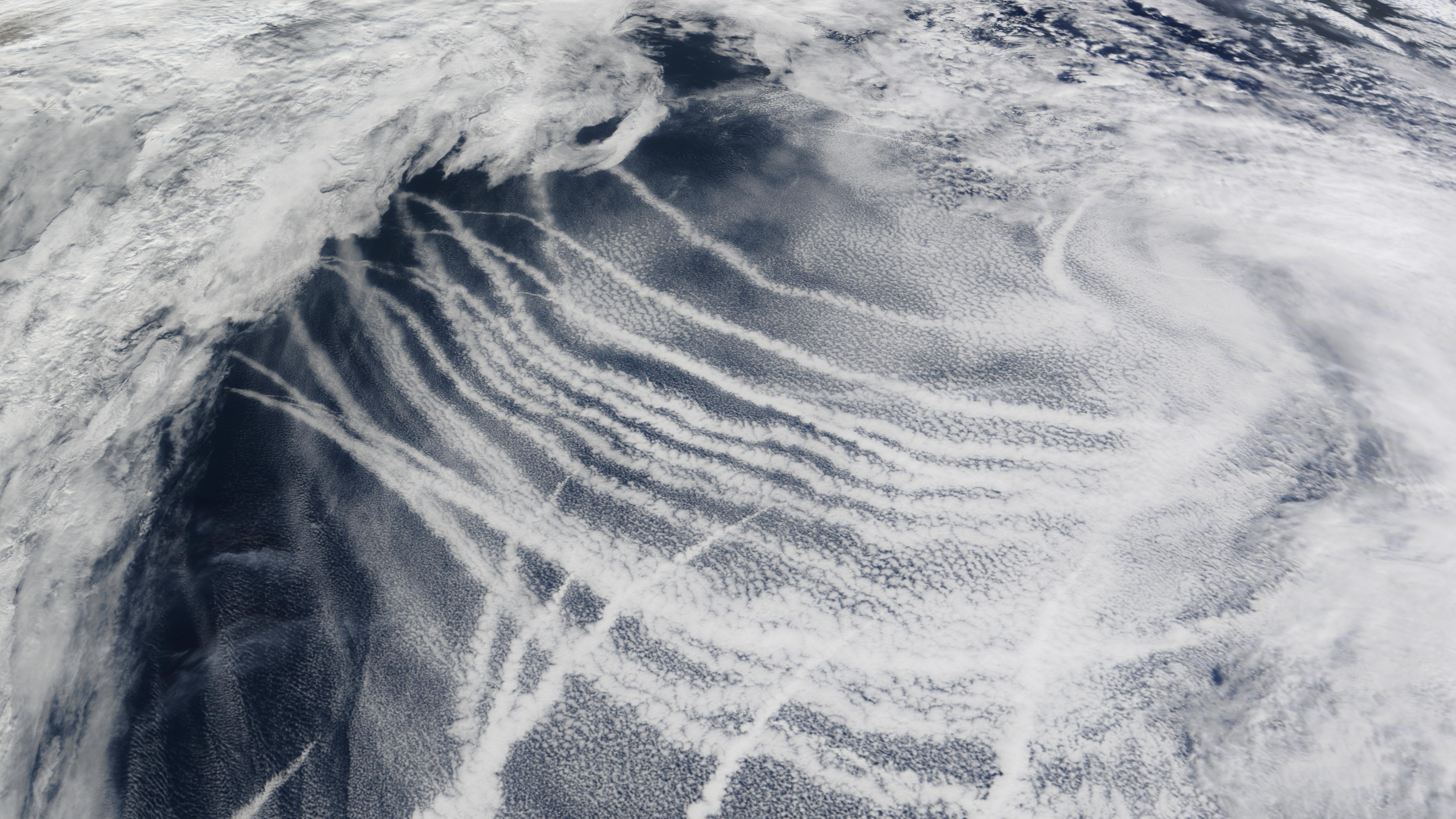
Visible ship tracks in the Northern Pacific, on 4 March 2009

To avoid confounders, many observations of aerosol effects focus on ship tracks, but post-2020 research found that visible ship tracks are a poor proxy for other clouds, and estimates derived from them overestimate aerosol cooling by as much as 200%. At the same time, other research found that the majority of ship tracks are "invisible" to satellites, meaning that the earlier research had underestimated aerosol cooling by overlooking them. Finally, 2023 research indicates that all climate models have underestimated sulfur emissions from volcanoes which occur in the background, outside of major eruptions, and so had consequently overestimated the cooling provided by anthropogenic aerosols, especially in the Arctic climate.

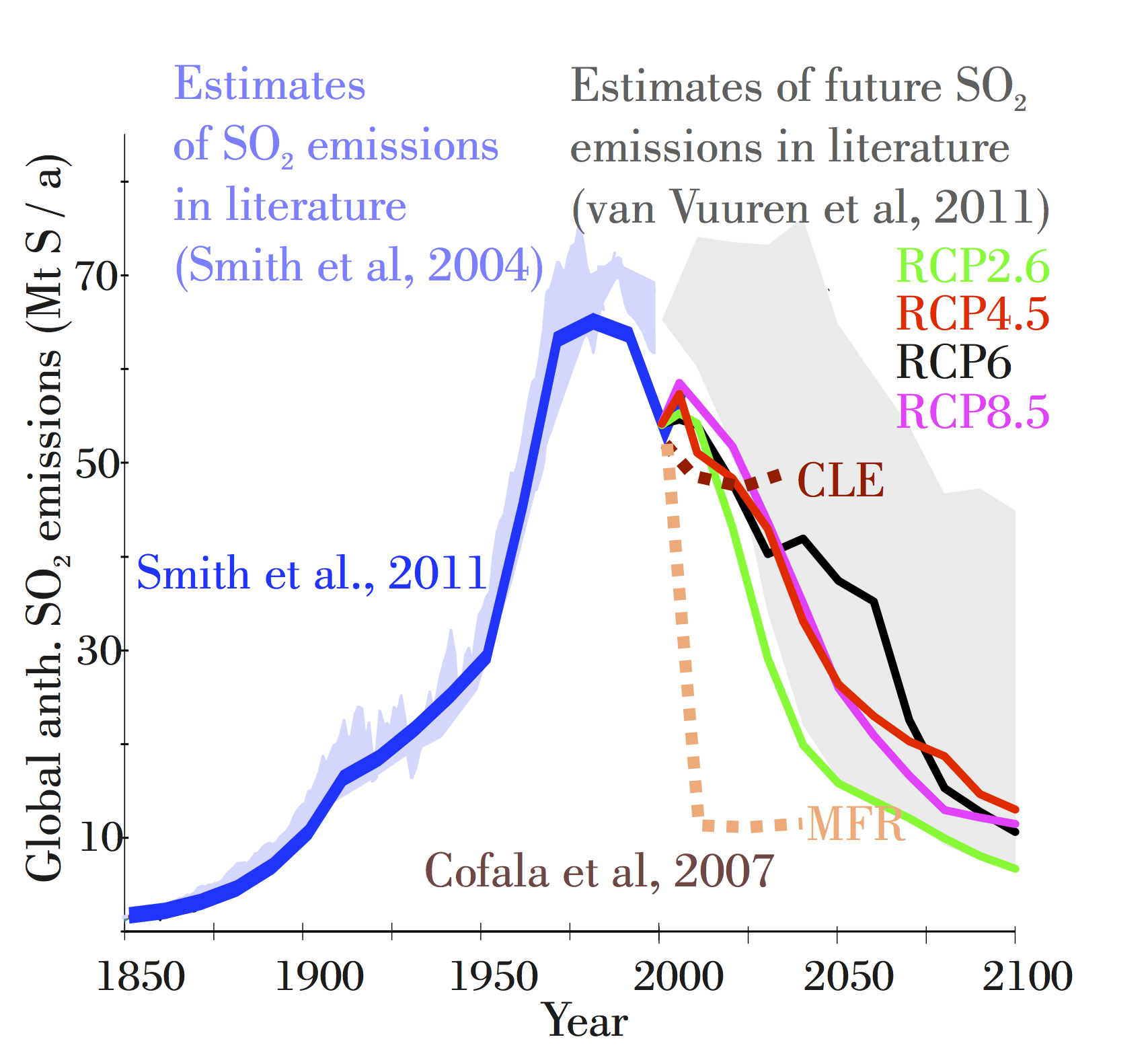
Early 2010s estimates of past and future anthropogenic global sulfur dioxide emissions, including the Representative Concentration Pathways. While no climate change scenario may reach Maximum Feasible Reductions (MFRs), all assume steep declines from today's levels. By 2019, sulfate emission reductions were confirmed to proceed at a very fast rate.

Estimates of how much aerosols affect cloud cooling are very important, because the amount of sulfate aerosols in the air had undergone dramatic changes in the recent decades. First, it had increased greatly from the 1950s to 1980s, largely due to the widespread burning of sulfur-heavy coal, which caused an observable reduction in visible sunlight that had been described as global dimming. Then, it started to decline substantially from the 1990s onwards and is expected to continue to decline in the future, due to the measures to combat acid rain and other impacts of air pollution. Consequently, the aerosols provided a considerable cooling effect which counteracted or "masked" some of the greenhouse effect from human emissions, and this effect had been declining as well, which contributed to acceleration of climate change.

Climate models do account for the presence of aerosols and their recent and future decline in their projections, and typically estimate that the cooling they provide in 2020s is similar to the warming from human-added atmospheric methane, meaning that simultaneous reductions in both would effectively cancel each other out. However, the existing uncertainty about aerosol-cloud interactions likewise introduces uncertainty into models, particularly when concerning predictions of changes in weather events over the regions with a poorer historical record of atmospheric observations. See also

- Cloud formation
- Earth's energy budget
- Fixed anvil temperature hypothesis
