= Kelly Wanser =

American entrepreneur and climate advocate

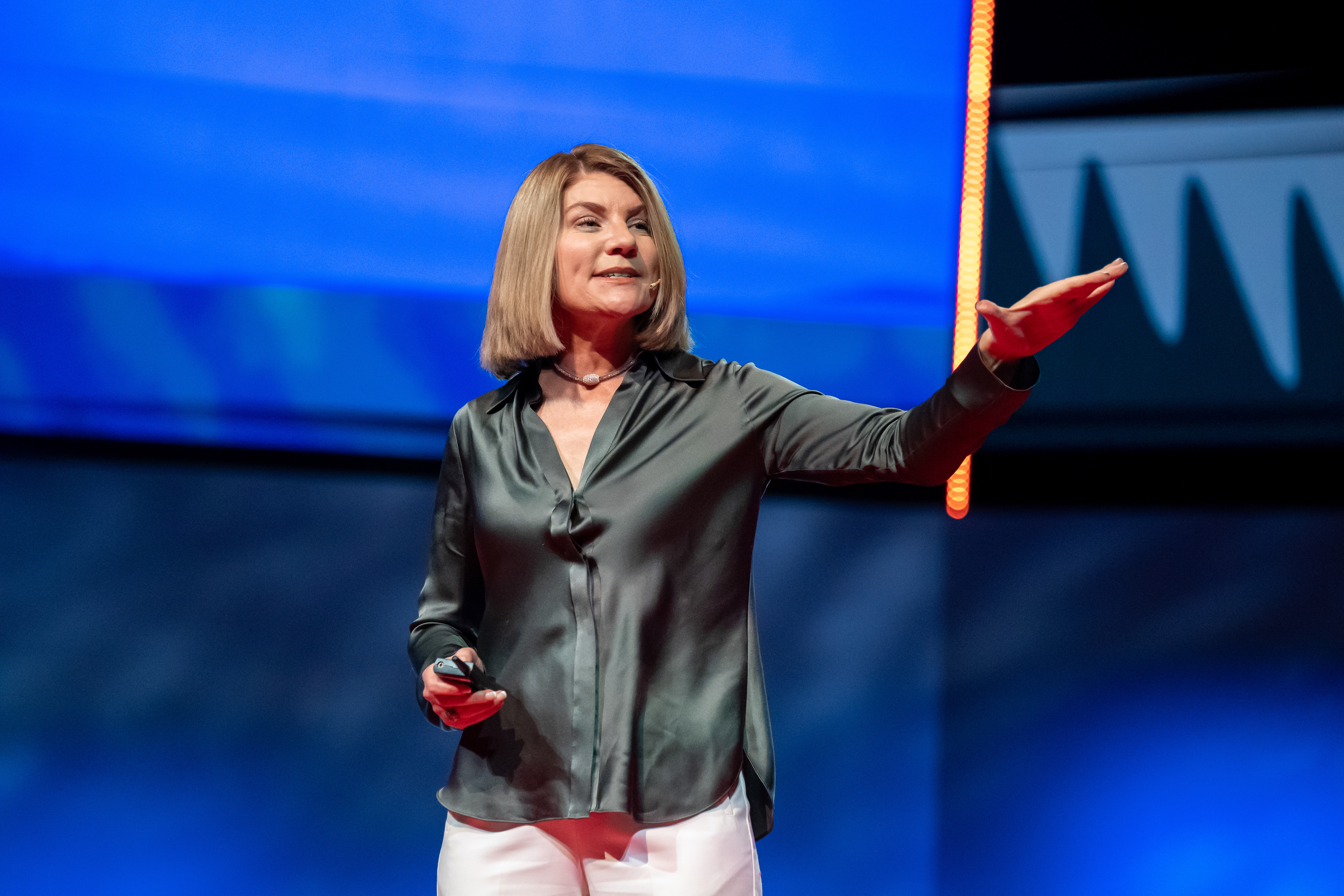
- Education: Boston College; University of Oxford
- Scientific career
- Fields: Climate intervention
- Website: www.silverlining.ngo

Kelly Wanser is an American entrepreneur, innovator and climate advocate. She supports research into climate intervention approaches as "emergency medicine" for climate change.

Wanser is the founder and executive director of SilverLining, a nonprofit organization that advances research and policy to address near-term climate risks. She is also the co-founder of and a senior advisor to the Marine Cloud Brightening Project, a non-profit collaboration of scientists created to advance understanding of cloud responses to aerosol particles.

== Education ==
Wanser received a BA in Economics and Philosophy from Boston College, and studied philosophy, politics and economics at the University of Oxford. She served as a volunteer lecturer in economics and philosophy for two years at St. John's College in Belize City.

== Climate advocacy ==
While working in the technology sector in 2008, Wanser met scientists Ken Caldeira, Steve Schneider, John Latham, and others who introduced her to the possibility of cooling the climate by reflecting solar light, dispersing particles to increase the reflection of sunlight from the atmosphere and clouds. Wanser was a part of a small community of early pioneers in the field and coined the term marine cloud brightening to describe the potential to increase the reflectivity of low-lying marine clouds by injecting them with aerosols.

Wanser co-founded the Marine Cloud Brightening Project at the University of Washington in 2009, hosting initial meetings with collaborators in Seattle and Edinburgh, securing a small amount of research funding.

A 2017 hearing called by Republican legislators in the United States House of Representatives saw Wanser testify before the United States House Committee on Science, Space, and Technology. The hearing was later described as an unusual "rational discussion on climate change" by the committee.

Wanser founded SilverLining in 2018, a science-based policy and advocacy organization, with the goal of advancing research in options to address near-term climate risk. She helped advance a study by the U.S. National Academy of Sciences, and introduce funding and legislative proposals in the U.S. Congress. In October 2020, SilverLining announced a fund to support research in approaches to increasing the reflection of sunlight from the atmosphere ("solar radiation modification"), providing $7m in grants to U.S. and international teams.

Wanser joined the Board of Biocarbon Engineering, now known as Dendra Systems, as its first Director in 2018. Operating in the United Kingdom and Australia, the company uses data, artificial intelligence (AI), drones and other technologies to restore and manage native ecosystems. The next year, she delivered a TED Talk entitled "Emergency Medicine for our Climate Fever".

Wanser has also served as an advisor to several groups and organizations, including Ocean Conservancy, Laser Inertial Fusion Energy (LIFE) Program at Lawrence Livermore National Laboratory, and has served a member of the President's Circle of the U.S. National Academy of Sciences.
