= Marine cloud brightening =

Proposed cloud-seeding technique

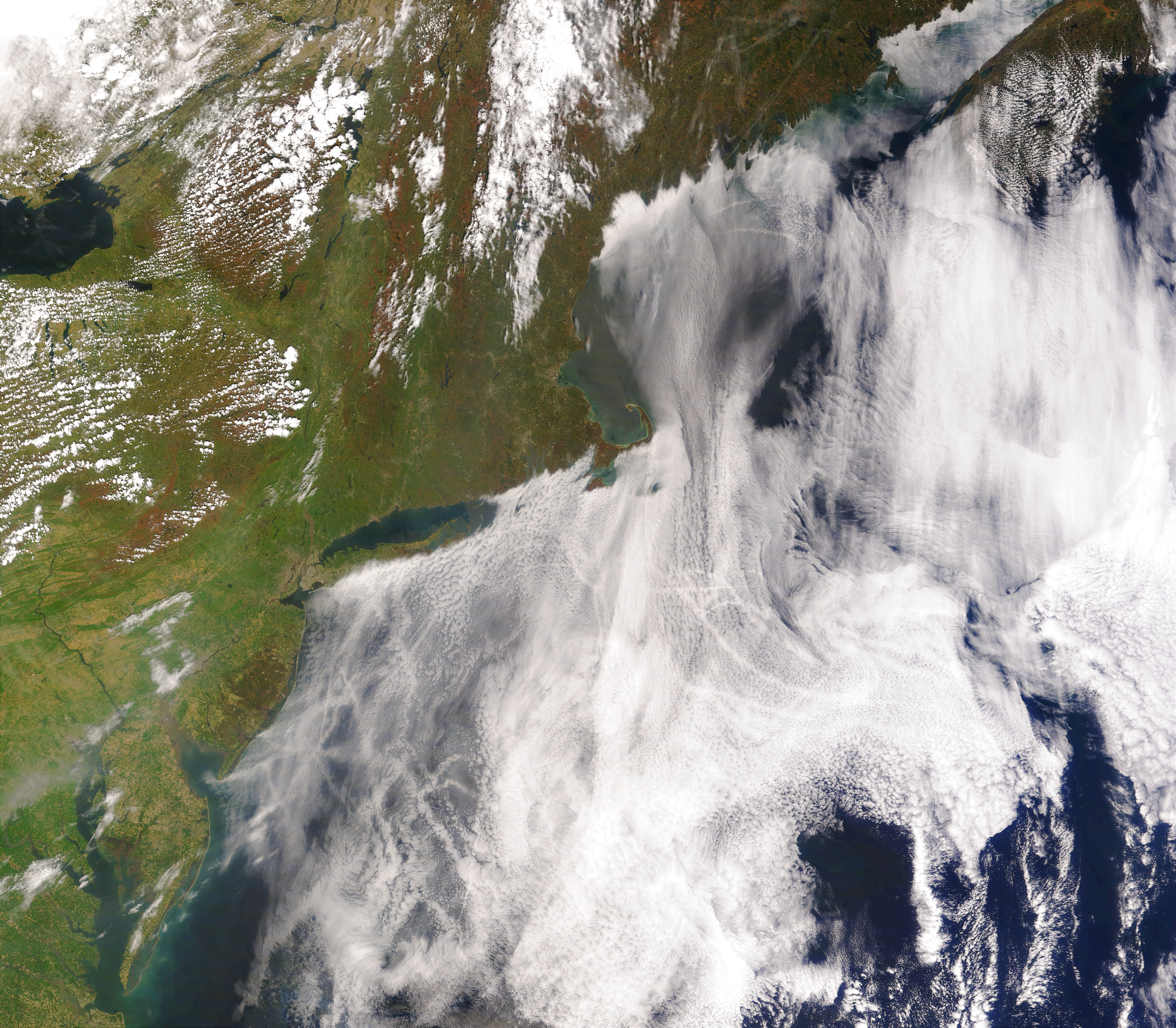
Exhaust from ships causing more and brighter clouds above the ocean in 2006

Marine cloud brightening (MCB), also known as marine cloud seeding or marine cloud engineering, may be a way to make stratocumulus clouds over the sea brighter, thus reflecting more sunlight back into space in order to limit global warming. It is one of two such methods that might feasibly have a substantial climate impact, but is lower in the atmosphere than stratospheric aerosol injection. It may be able to keep local areas from overheating. If used on a large scale it might increase the Earth's albedo; and so, in combination with greenhouse gas emissions reduction, limit climate change and its risks to people and the environment. If implemented, the cooling effect would be expected to be felt rapidly and to be reversible on fairly short time scales. However, technical barriers remain to large-scale marine cloud brightening, and it could not offset all the current warming. As clouds are complicated and poorly understood, the risks of marine cloud brightening are unclear.

Very small droplets of sea water are sprayed into the air to increase cloud reflectivity. The fine particles of sea salt enhance cloud condensation nuclei, making more cloud droplets so making the clouds more reflective. MCB could be implemented using fleets of unmanned rotor ships to disperse seawater mist into the air. Small-scale field tests were conducted on the Great Barrier Reef in 2024.

== Basic principles ==
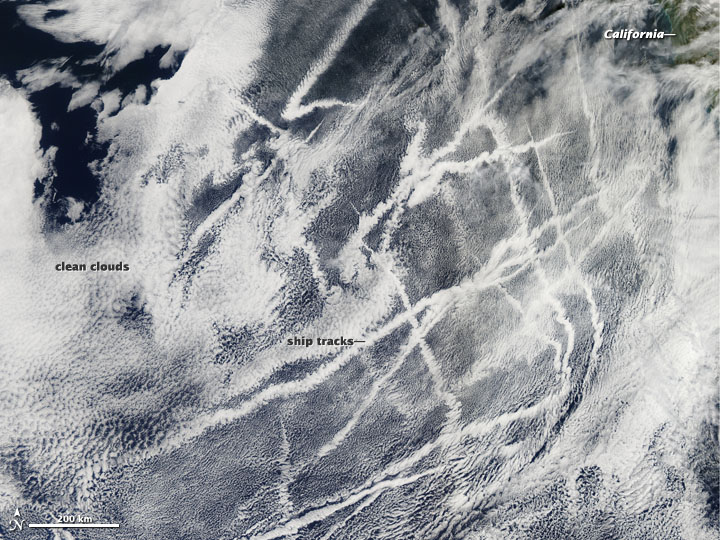
Ships churning across the Pacific Ocean left this cluster of bright cloud trails lingering in the atmosphere in 2012. The narrow clouds, known as ship tracks, form when water vapor condenses around tiny particles of pollution that ships either emit directly as exhaust or that form as a result of gases within the exhaust.

Marine cloud brightening is based on phenomena that are currently observed in the climate system. Today, emissions particles, such as soot, mix with clouds in the atmosphere and increase the amount of sunlight they reflect, reducing warming. This cooling effect is estimated at between 0.5 and 1.5 °C (0.9 and 2.7 °F), and is one of the most important unknowns in climate. Marine cloud brightening proposes to generate a similar effect using benign material, such as sea salt. Marine stratocumulus clouds are thought to be the most suitable because of their prevalence, coverage, accessibility, and generally low cloud drop number concentration. MCB also makes the clouds last longer. Although stratospheric aerosol injection would be much higher up, it could diffuse sunlight and so also brighten low-level marine clouds.

Most clouds are quite reflective, redirecting incoming solar radiation back into space. Increasing clouds' albedo would increase the portion of incoming solar radiation that is reflected, in turn cooling the planet. Clouds consist of water droplets, and clouds with smaller droplets are more reflective (because of the Twomey effect). Cloud condensation nuclei are necessary for water droplet formation. The central idea underlying marine cloud brightening is to add aerosols to atmospheric locations where clouds form. These would then act as cloud condensation nuclei, increasing the cloud albedo.

Marine cloud brightening on a small scale already occurs unintentionally due to the aerosols in ships' exhaust, leaving ship tracks. Changes to shipping regulations enacted by the United Nations' International Maritime Organization to reduce certain aerosols are hypothesized to be leading to reduced cloud cover and increased oceanic warming, providing additional support to the potential effectiveness of marine cloud brightening at modifying ocean temperature. Different cloud regimes are likely to have differing susceptibility to brightening strategies, with marine stratocumulus clouds (low, layered clouds over ocean regions) most sensitive to aerosol changes. These marine stratocumulus clouds are thus typically proposed as the target. They are common over the cooler regions of subtropical and midlatitude oceans, where their coverage can average over 50% over a year. The leading possible source of additional cloud condensation nuclei is salt from seawater, although there are others.

Even though the importance of aerosols for the formation of clouds is, in general, well understood, many uncertainties remain. The IPCC Fifth Assessment Report considers aerosol-cloud interactions as one of the current major challenges in climate modeling in general. In particular, the number of droplets does not increase proportionally when more aerosols are present, and can even decrease. Extrapolating the effects of particles on clouds observed on the microphysical scale to the regional, climatically relevant, scale is not straightforward. For example deployment in the South Pacific or South Atlantic could increase rainfall in western and central Africa but reduce it in southern Africa.

== Proposed local use ==
It has been suggested that MCB should be used to preserve Arctic sea ice.

== Climatic impacts ==
=== Reduction in global warming ===
The modeling evidence of the global climatic effects of marine cloud brightening remains limited. Current modeling research indicates that marine cloud brightening could substantially cool the planet. A 2020 study found a substantial increase in cloud reflectivity from shipping in the southeast Atlantic basin, suggesting that a regional-scale test of MCB in stratocumulus‐dominated regions could be successful.

Studies in the late 2010s estimated that this technique could produce up to 2 W/m^{2} of negative radiative forcing, (Note: there may be a mistake in AR6 which says up to 5 W/m² of negative radiative forcing. - The IPCC AR6 stated "1–5 W m–2, depending on the scale and amount of sea salt injection; heterogeneous radiative forcing" for "Global Mean Negative Radiative Forcing Potential and Characteristics". But looking at the underlying sources, it appears that the IPCC report is not quite correct. Both of the newer IPCC-cited articles 1, 2 gave maximum global negative RF as 2.0 W/m2, and the older two give no values. However, one of the newer cited articles does refer back to this one from 2012 which concludes "we predicted a [global] radiative flux perturbation (RFP) of −5.1 W m−2, which is enough to counteract warming from doubled CO2 concentration." This seems like an outlier.) which is less than human-caused radiative forcing of almost 3 W/m^{2}. The climatic impacts of marine cloud brightening would be rapidly responsive and reversible. If the brightening activity were to change in intensity, or stop altogether, then the clouds' brightness would respond within a few days to weeks, as the cloud condensation nuclei particles precipitate naturally.

A 2024 study used a unique reduced complexity modeling framework to evaluate the effectiveness of marine cloud brightening across different cloud types. The study reported that anthropogenic aerosols have likely offset approximately one-third of greenhouse gas–induced warming since the industrial era, and marine cloud brightening leverages this effect by enhancing cloud reflectivity via modified droplet concentrations. Their results also underscore the importance of considering background droplet size and concentration—not just meteorological variables—when designing cloud brightening interventions.

Again unlike stratospheric aerosol injection, marine cloud brightening might be able to be used regionally, albeit in a limited manner. Marine stratocumulus clouds are common in particular regions, specifically the eastern Pacific Ocean and the eastern South Atlantic Ocean. A typical finding among simulation studies was a persistent cooling of the Pacific, similar to the La Niña phenomenon, and, despite the localized nature of the albedo change, an increase in polar sea ice. Studies aim at making simulation findings derived from different models comparable.

=== Side effects ===
There is some potential for changes to precipitation patterns and amplitude, although modeling suggests that the changes are likely less than those for stratospheric aerosol injection and considerably smaller than for unabated anthropogenic global warming. The effects may be like La Niña.

Regional implementations of MCB would need care to avoid causing possibly adverse consequences in areas far away from the region they are aiming to help. For example, a potential Marine Cloud Brightening aimed at cooling the Western United States could risk causing increasing heat in Europe, due to climate teleconnections such as unintended perturbation of the Atlantic meridional overturning circulation.

== Research ==
Marine cloud brightening was originally suggested by John Latham in 1990. Because clouds remain a major source of uncertainty in climate change, some research projects into cloud reflectivity in the general climate change context have provided insight into marine cloud brightening specifically. For example, one project released smoke behind ships in the Pacific Ocean and monitored the particulates' impact on clouds. Although this was done in order to better understand clouds and climate change, the research has implications for marine cloud brightening.

A research coalition called the Marine Cloud Brightening Project was formed in order to coordinate research activities. Its proposed program includes modeling, field experiments, technology development and policy research to study cloud-aerosol effects and marine cloud brightening. The proposed program currently serves as a model for process-level (environmentally benign) experimental programs in the atmosphere.Formed in 2009 by Kelly Wanser with support from Ken Caldeira, the project is now housed at the University of Washington.

The shipping industry may have been carrying out an unintentional experiment in marine cloud brightening due to the emissions of ships and causing a global temperature reduction of as much as 0.25 ˚C lower than they would otherwise have been. A 2020 study found a substantial increase in cloud reflectivity from shipping in the southeast Atlantic, suggesting that a regional-scale test of MCB in stratocumulus‐dominated regions could be successful.

Marine cloud brightening is being field tested as a way to shade and cool the Great Barrier Reef in Australia, as part of the Reef Restoration and Adaptation Program. As of 2024 it is thought that the salt spray can deliver particles into low clouds. Although research is not yet complete, experts on the project say that if deployed it would not effect any other countries. Unlike experiments in some other places, this research is supported locally and by most Australians.

== Proposed methods ==
The leading proposed method for marine cloud brightening is to generate a fine mist of salt from seawater, and to deliver into targeted banks of marine stratocumulus clouds from ships traversing the ocean. This requires technology that can generate optimally-sized (~200 nm) sea-salt particles and deliver them at sufficient force and scale to penetrate low-lying marine clouds. The resulting spray mist must then be delivered continuously into target clouds over the ocean.

In the earliest published studies, John Latham and Stephen Salter proposed a fleet of around 1500 unmanned Rotor ships, or Flettner ships, that would spray mist created from seawater into the air.

Subsequent researchers determined that transport efficiency was only relevant for use at scale, and that for research requirements, standard ships could be used for transport. (Some researchers considered aircraft as an option, but concluded that it would be too costly.) Droplet generation and delivery technology is critical to progress, and technology research has been focused on solving this challenging problem.

As of 2025 how far the plume would travel and how much would reach the cloud layer is not known.

Other methods were proposed and discounted, including:

- Using small droplets of seawater into the air through ocean foams. When bubbles in the foams burst, they loft small droplets of seawater.
- Using piezoelectric transducers. This would create Faraday waves at a free surface. If the waves are steep enough, droplets of sea water will be thrown from the crests and the resulting salt particles can enter the clouds. However, a significant amount of energy is required.
- Using engine or smoke emissions as a source for CCN. Paraffin oil particles have also been proposed, though their viability has been discounted.

== Costs ==
The costs of marine cloud brightening remain largely unknown. A report of the US National Academies suggested roughly five billion US dollars annually for a large deployment program.

== Governance ==
Marine cloud brightening would be governed primarily by international law because it would likely take place outside of countries' territorial waters, and because it would affect the environment of other countries and of the oceans. For the most part, the international law governing solar radiation management in general would apply. For example, according to customary international law, if a country were to conduct or approve a marine cloud brightening activity that would pose significant risk of harm to the environments of other countries or of the oceans, then that country would be obligated to minimize this risk pursuant to a due diligence standard. In this, the country would need to require authorization for the activity (if it were to be conducted by a private actor), perform a prior environmental impact assessment, notify and cooperate with potentially affected countries, and inform the public.

Marine cloud brightening activities would be further governed by the international law of the sea, and particularly by the United Nations Convention on the Law of the Sea (UNCLOS). Parties to the UNCLOS are obligated to "protect and preserve the marine environment," including by preventing, reducing, and controlling pollution of the marine environment from any source. The "marine environment" is not defined but is widely interpreted as including the ocean's water, lifeforms, and the air above. "Pollution of the marine environment" is defined in a way that includes global warming and greenhouse gases. The UNCLOS could thus be interpreted as obligating the involved parties to use methods such as marine cloud brightening if these were found to be effective and environmentally benign. Whether marine cloud brightening itself could be such pollution of the marine environment is unclear. At the same time, in combating pollution, Parties are "not to transfer, directly or indirectly, damage or hazards from one area to another or transform one type of pollution into another." If marine cloud brightening were found to cause damage or hazards, the UNCLOS could prohibit it. If marine cloud brightening activities were to be "marine scientific research"—also an undefined term—then UNCLOS Parties have a right to conduct the research, subject to some qualifications. Like all other ships, those that would conduct marine cloud brightening must bear the flag of the country that has given them permission to do so and to which the ship has a genuine link, even if the ship is unmanned or automated. The flagged state must exercise its jurisdiction over those ships. The legal implications would depend on, among other things, whether the activity were to occur in territorial waters, an exclusive economic zone (EEZ), or the high seas; and whether the activity was scientific research or not. Coastal states would need to approve any marine cloud brightening activities in their territorial waters. In the EEZ, the ship must comply with the coastal state's laws and regulations. It appears that the state conducting marine cloud brightening activities in another state's EEZ would not need the latter's permission, unless the activity were marine scientific research. In that case, the coastal state should grant permission in normal circumstances. States would be generally free to conduct marine cloud brightening activities on the high seas, provided that this is done with "due regard" for other states' interests. There is some legal unclarity regarding unmanned or automated ships.

As of 2025 MCB is being considered for addition to the London Convention on the Prevention of Marine Pollution by Dumping of Wastes and Other Matter, which might mean that parties to the convention would have to assess projects under Annex V of the convention's London Protocol.

== Advantages and disadvantages ==
Marine cloud brightening appears to have most of the advantages and disadvantages of solar radiation management in general. For example, it presently appears to be inexpensive relative to suffering climate change damages and greenhouse gas emissions abatement, fast acting, and reversible in its direct climatic effects. Some advantages and disadvantages are specific to it, relative to other proposed solar radiation management techniques.

Compared with other proposed solar radiation management methods, such as stratospheric aerosols injection, marine cloud brightening may be able to be partially localized in its effects. This could, for example, be used to stabilize the West Antarctic Ice Sheet. Furthermore, marine cloud brightening, as it is currently envisioned, would use only natural substances sea water and wind, instead of introducing human-made substances into the environment.

Potential disadvantages include that specific MCB implementations could have a varying effect across time; the same intervention might even become a net contributor to global warming some years after being first launched, though this could be avoided with careful planning.

== See also ==
- Climate engineering
- Cirrus cloud thinning
