= Cloud albedo =

Fraction of incoming sunlight reflected by clouds

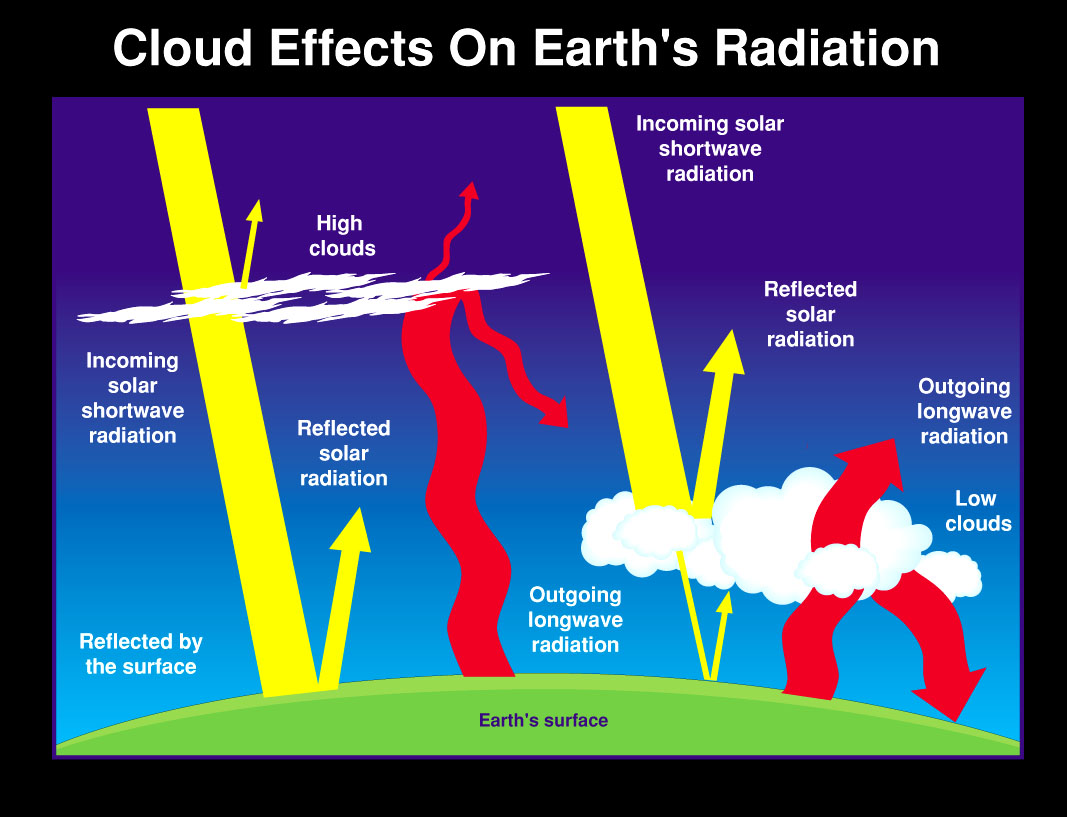
NASA graphic representing the distribution of solar radiation

Cloud albedo is a measure of the albedo or reflectivity of a cloud. Clouds regulate the amount of solar radiation absorbed by a planet and its solar surface irradiance. Generally, increased cloud cover correlates to a higher albedo and a lower absorption of solar energy. Cloud albedo strongly influences the Earth's energy budget, accounting for approximately half of Earth's albedo. Cloud albedo is influenced by the conditions of cloud formation and variations in cloud albedo depend on the total mass of water, the size and shape of the droplets or particles and their distribution in space. Thick clouds reflect a large amount of incoming solar radiation, translating to a high albedo. Thin clouds tend to transmit more solar radiation and, therefore, have a low albedo. Changes in cloud albedo caused by variations in cloud properties have a significant effect on global climate, having the ability to spiral into feedback loops.

== Cloud condensation nuclei and cloud albedo ==
On a microscopic scale, clouds are formed through the condensation of water on cloud condensation nuclei. These nuclei are aerosols such as dust or sea salt but also include certain forms of pollution. Nuclei come from a variety of natural or anthropogenic sources. For example dust can arise from windblown deserts or from human agricultural or construction activities, similarly even pollutants like VOCs or sulfates may be emitted by plant life or volcanic activity respectively. The size, concentration, structure, and chemical composition of these particles influence cloud albedo. For example, black carbon aerosol particles absorb more solar radiation and sulfate aerosols reflects more solar radiation. Smaller particles form smaller cloud droplets, which tend to decrease precipitation efficiency of a cloud and increasing cloud albedo. Additionally, more cloud condensation nuclei increases the size of a cloud and the amount of reflected solar radiation.

== Causes of cloud albedo variation ==
Cloud albedo on a planet varies from less than 10% to more than 90% and depends on liquid water/ice content, thickness of the cloud, droplet sizes, solar zenith angle, etc.

=== Water content ===
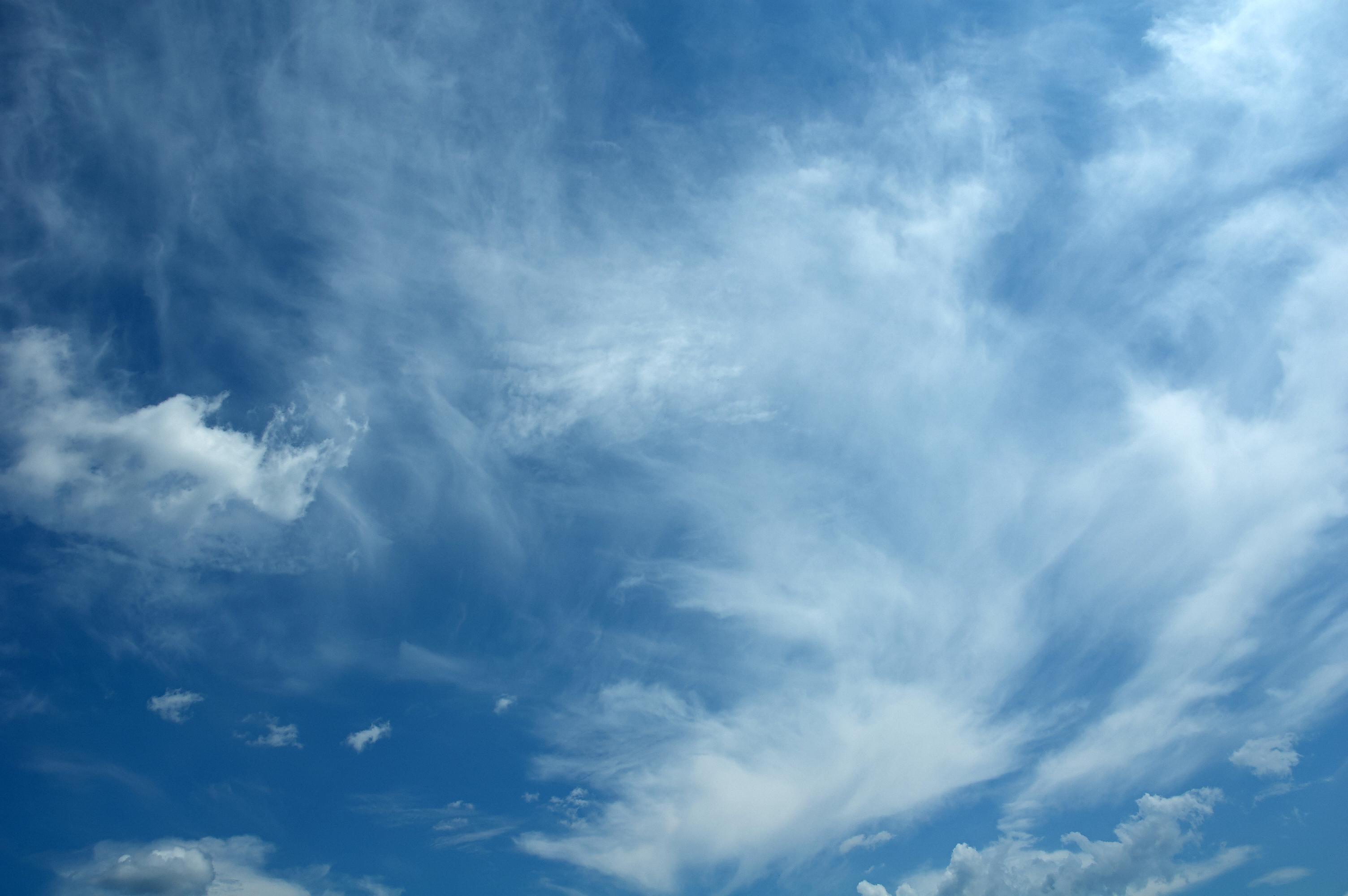
Image of cirrus clouds taken in Russia uploaded to Wikimedia Commons by user Knopik-som

Higher liquid water and ice content in a cloud increases its albedo, which is the dominant factor in determining the cloud's reflectivity. The change in albedo is greater for clouds with less water content to start with and larger clouds begin to receive diminishing returns with increased content. Water content taking the form of ice is common in high altitude clouds such as cirrus.

=== Cloud thickness ===
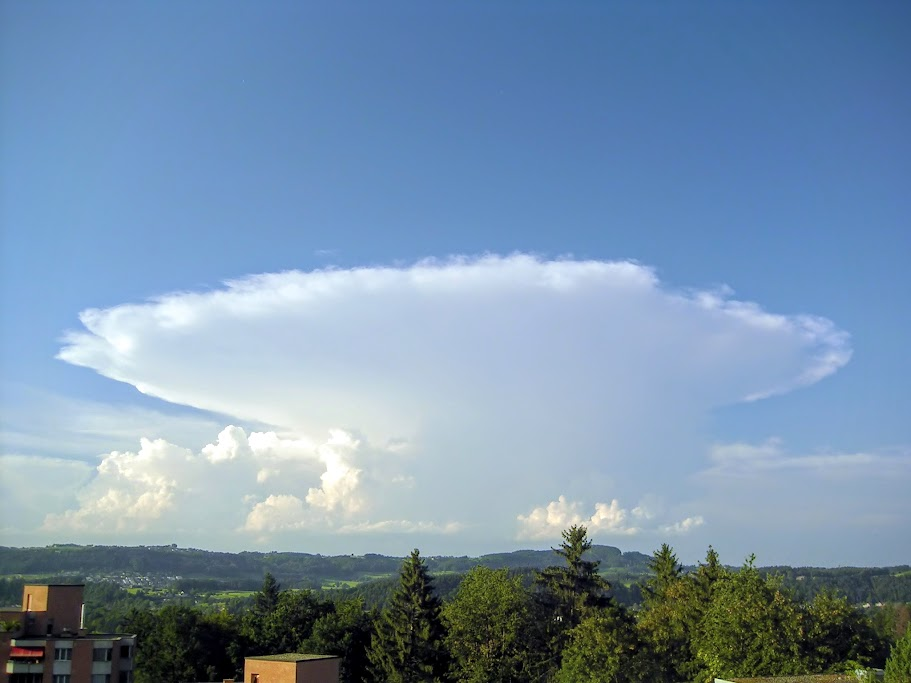
Archetypical anvil shaped cumulonimbus cloud photographed by Simon Eugster in April 2005

Thicker clouds have a higher albedo than thinner ones. In fact thick clouds and thin clouds will occasionally respond differently to differences in other factors such as droplet size. Clouds that tend to be thicker and have higher albedos include cumulus, stratocumulus, and cumulonimbus clouds.

==== Liquid water path ====
Water content and cloud thickness together make a cloud's liquid water path. This value also notably varies with changing cloud droplet size. Liquid water path is typically measured in units of g/m^{2} and in excess of 20 g/m^{2} clouds typically will become opaque to long-wavelength light although this may not hold true with cirrus clouds.

=== Droplet size ===
In general smaller droplet size is associated with increased albedo. That said, depending on the cloud location, thin clouds may actually have the opposite hold true. In the general and more influential cases however, decreased particle size makes clouds possess higher albedos by having a larger surface areas relative to their volumes. This makes the droplets whiter or more reflective.

=== The Twomey Effect (Aerosol Indirect Effect) ===
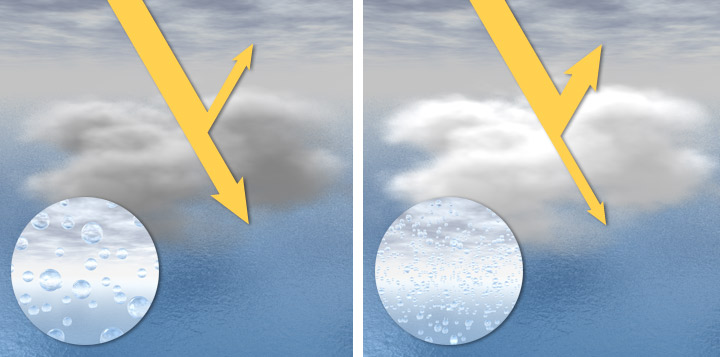
Increased cloud droplet concentration and albedo due to aerosol effect

The Twomey Effect is increased cloud albedo due to cloud nuclei from pollution. Increasing aerosol concentration and aerosol density leads to higher cloud droplet concentration, smaller cloud droplets, and higher cloud albedo. In macrophysically identical clouds, a cloud with few larger drops will have a lower albedo than a cloud with more smaller drops. The smaller cloud particles similarly increase cloud albedo by reducing precipitation and prolonging the lifetime of a cloud. This subsequently increases cloud albedo as solar radiation is reflected over a longer period of time. The Albrecht Effect is the related concept of increased cloud lifetime from cloud nuclei.

=== Zenith angle ===
Cloud albedo increases with the total water content or depth of the cloud and the solar zenith angle. The variation of albedo with zenith angle is most rapid when the sun is near the horizon, and least when the sun is overhead. Absorption of solar radiation by plane-parallel clouds decreases with increasing zenith angle because radiation that is reflected to space at the higher zenith angles penetrates less deeply into the cloud and is therefore less likely to be absorbed.

== Influence on global climate ==
Cloud albedo indirectly affects global climate through solar radiation scattering and absorption in Earth's radiation budget. Variations in cloud albedo cause atmospheric instability that influences the hydrological cycle, weather patterns, and atmospheric circulation. These effects are parameterized by cloud radiative forcing, a measure of short-wave and long-wave radiation in relation to cloud cover. The Earth Radiation Budget Experiment demonstrated that small variations in cloud coverage, structure, altitude, droplet size, and phase have significant effects on the climate. A five percent increase in short-wave reflection from clouds would counteract the greenhouse effect of the past two-hundred years.

=== Cloud albedo-climate feedback loops ===
There are a variety of positive and negative cloud albedo-climate feedback loops in cloud and climate models. An example of a negative cloud-climate feedback loop is that as a planet warms, cloudiness increases, which increases a planet's albedo. An increase in albedo reduces absorbed solar radiation and leads to cooling. A counteracting positive feedback loop considers the rising of the high cloud layer, reduction in the vertical distribution of cloudiness, and decreased albedo.

Air pollution can result in variation in cloud condensation nuclei, creating a feedback loop that influences atmospheric temperature, relative humidity, and cloud formation depending on cloud and regional characteristics. For example, increased sulfate aerosols can reduce precipitation efficiency, resulting in a positive feedback loop in which decreased precipitation efficiency increases aerosol atmospheric longevity. On the other hand, a negative feedback loop can be established in mixed-phase clouds in which black carbon aerosol can increase ice phase precipitation formation and reduce aerosol concentrations.
