= Waves and Instabilities from a Neutral Dynamo =

Waves and Instabilities from a Neutral Dynamo or WINDY is space experiment mission for the purpose to study a phenomenon that occurs in the ionosphere – a layer of charged particles in the upper atmosphere.

== Mission ==
WINDY is a NASA rocket mission that hopes to study disturbances in the upper atmosphere that might interfere with communication and technology systems. The experiment will form night-time white artificial clouds that will be visible by residents of the Republic of the Marshall Islands during two rocket flights. The rockets were launched September 9, 2017.
