= Anthropogenic =

Anthropogenic ("human" + "generating") is an adjective that may refer to:

- Anthropogeny, the study of the origins of humanity

Anthropogenic may also refer to things that have been generated by humans, as follows:

- Human impact on the environment, i.e. anthropogenic impact on the environment
  - Anthropogenic biome
  - Anthropogenic climate change, human-caused global warming and its effects
  - Anthropogenic cloud
  - Anthropogenic fire, fires started by humans, deliberately or accidentally
  - Anthropogenic greenhouse gases
  - Anthropogenic hazard
  - Anthropogenic metabolism
