= Fixed anvil temperature hypothesis =

Theory of cloud radiation emission

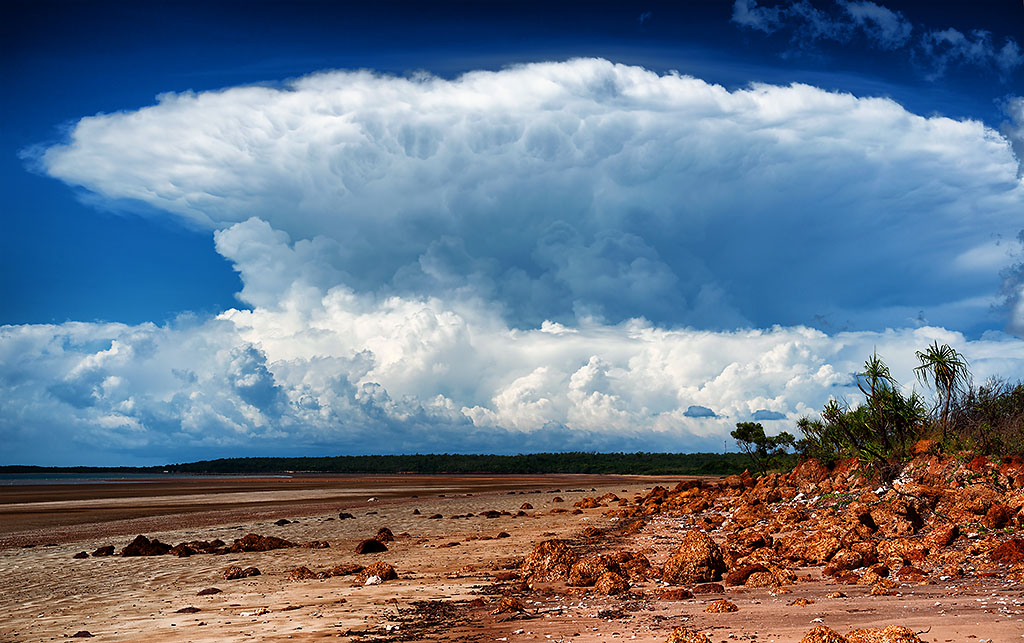
Anvil cloud over the Tiwi Islands, Australia

Fixed anvil temperature hypothesis is a physical hypothesis that describes the response of cloud radiative properties to rising surface temperatures. It presumes that the temperature at which radiation is emitted by anvil clouds is constrained by radiative processes and thus does not change in response to surface warming. Since the amount of radiation emitted by clouds is a function of their temperature, it implies that it does not increase with surface warming and thus a warmer surface does not increase radiation emissions (and thus cooling) by cloud tops. The mechanism has been identified both in climate models and observations of cloud behaviour, it affects how much the world heats up for each extra tonne of greenhouse gas in the atmosphere. However, some evidence suggests that it may be more correctly formulated as decreased anvil warming rather than no anvil warming.

== Background and hypothesis ==
In the tropics, the radiative cooling of the troposphere is balanced by the release of latent heat through condensation of water vapour lofted to high altitudes by convection. The radiative cooling is mostly a consequence of emissions by water vapour and thus becomes ineffective above the 200 hPa pressure level. Congruently, it is at this elevation that thick clouds and anvil clouds – the topmost convective clouds – concentrate.

The "fixed anvil temperature hypothesis" stipulates that owing to energetic and thermodynamic constraints imposed by the Clausius-Clapeyron relationship, the temperature and thus radiative cooling of anvil clouds does not change much with surface temperature. Specifically, cooling decreases below −73 °C (200 K) as the ineffective radiative cooling by CO_{2} becomes dominant below that temperature. Instead, the elevation of high clouds rises with surface temperatures.

A related hypothesis is that tropopause temperatures are insensitive to surface warming; however it appears to have distinct mechanisms from the fixed anvil temperature process. They have been related to each other in several studies, which sometimes find a fixed tropopause temperature a more reasonable theory than fixed anvil temperature.

== Evidence ==
The fixed anvil temperature hypothesis has been widely accepted and even extended to the non-tropical atmosphere. Its strength relies in part on its reliance on simple physical arguments.

=== Models ===
The fixed anvil temperature hypothesis was initially formulated by Hartmann and Larson 2002 in the context of the NCAR/PSU MM5 climate model but the stability of top cloud temperatures was already observed in a one-dimensional model by Hansen et al. 1981. It has also been recovered, with limitations, in climate models and in numerous general circulation models. However, some have recovered a dependence on cloud size and on relative humidity or that the fixed anvil temperature is more properly expressed as anvil temperature changing more slowly than surface temperature. Climate models also simulate an increase in cloud top height and some radiative-convective models apply it to the outflow of tropical cyclones.

The fixed anvil temperature hypothesis has also been obtained in simulations of exoplanet climates. At very high CO_{2} concentrations approaching a runaway greenhouse however, other physical effects pertaining to cloud opacity may take over and dominate the fixed anvil temperature as surface temperatures reach extreme levels.

=== Observations ===
The fixed anvil temperature hypothesis has been backed by observational studies for large clouds. Smaller clouds however have no stable temperature and there are temperature fluctuations of about 5 °C (9 °F) which may relate to processes involving the Brewer-Dobson circulation. Xu et al. 2007 found that cloud temperatures are more stable for clouds with sizes exceeding 150 kilometres (93 mi). The ascent of cloud top height with warming is also supported by observations. Analyses of convection changes during the El Niño-Southern Oscillation cycle support the hypothesis, stipulating that a moister middle troposphere offsets the effects of less favourable thermodynamics during El Niño.

== Implications ==
Clouds are the second biggest uncertainty in future climate change after human actions, as their effects are complicated and not properly understood. The fixed anvil temperature hypothesis has effects on global climate sensitivity, since anvil clouds are the most important source of outgoing radiation linked to tropical convection and their temperature being stable would render the outgoing radiation non-responsive to surface temperature changes. This creates a positive feedback component of cloud feedback. The fixed anvil temperature hypothesis has also been used to argue that climate modelling should use temperature rather than pressure to model the height of high clouds.

== Alternative views ==
A hypothesis which would have the opposite effect on climate is the iris hypothesis, according to which the coverage of anvil clouds declines with warming, thus allowing more radiation to escape into space and resulting in slower warming. The proportionate anvil warming hypothesis by Zelinka and Hartmann 2010 was formulated on the basis of general circulation models and envisages a small increase of anvil temperature with high warming. The latter hypothesis was intended as a modification to the fixed anvil temperature hypothesis and includes considerations of atmospheric stability and appears to reflect actual climate conditions more closely. Finally, there is a view that cloud top temperatures could actually decrease with surface warming as convection height rises. This may constitute a non-equilibrium response.

== Research ==
As of 2020 further research is needed to properly understand the physics of some cloud feedbacks, as they differ between models, and progress on properly modelling clouds globally is very slow.
