= Sean A. Twomey =

Irish atmospheric physicist (1927–2012)

Sean Twomey
- Born: 1927; County Cork, Ireland
- Died: 2012 (aged 84 or 85); Tucson, Arizona

Academic background
- Education: National University of Ireland, Galway (BSc, MSc, PhD)

Sean Andrew Twomey (/ˈtuːmiː/ TOO-mee; 1927–2012) was an Irish professor of atmospheric physics who made contributions to remote sensing, cloud physics and inversion mathematics. The Twomey effect, the mechanism by which aerosols can increase the albedo of clouds and cool the climate, is named after him.

Sean Twomey's 1974 paper 'Pollution and the planetary albedo' was one of two papers to be awarded the 2004 Haagen-Smit Prize by the editors of the journal Atmospheric Environment.

== Early life and education ==
Sean Andrew Twomey was born in Cork, Ireland, in 1927. He obtained a BSc and MSc in physics in 1947 and 1948 respectively, followed by a PhD in physics in 1955 from the National University of Ireland, Galway.

== Career ==
In the 1950s, Twomey conducted research in aerosol microphysics at the Commonwealth Scientific and Industrial Research Organisation (CSIRO) in Australia. In 1959 he moved to the United States, working first at the National Oceanic and Atmospheric Administration, then from 1963 at the Naval Research Laboratory, during which time he developed the constrained linear inversion method for determining aerosol size distributions from measurements. Twomey returned to the CSIRO in 1968. In 1974, he published the paper "Pollution and the Planetary Albedo", which described how anthropogenic aerosols acting as cloud condensation nuclei could increase the optical thickness and reflectivity of clouds, thereby increasing the sunlight reflected by the Earth and reducing global temperatures. This phenomenon became known as the Twomey effect, or the first aerosol indirect effect.

In 1976, Twomey was appointed professor at the University of Arizona's Department of Atmospheric Physics, a position he held until his retirement in 1990.

== Bibliography ==
- Twomey, Sean (1977); Introduction to the Mathematics of Inversion in Remote Sensing and Indirect Measurements. Elsevier.
- Twomey, Sean (1979); Atmospheric Aerosols. Elsevier.

== Awards ==
- 1980 Carl-Gustaf Rossby Research Medal
- 2004 Haagen-Smit Prize
