= Twomey effect =

Greater solar radiation reflected by clouds

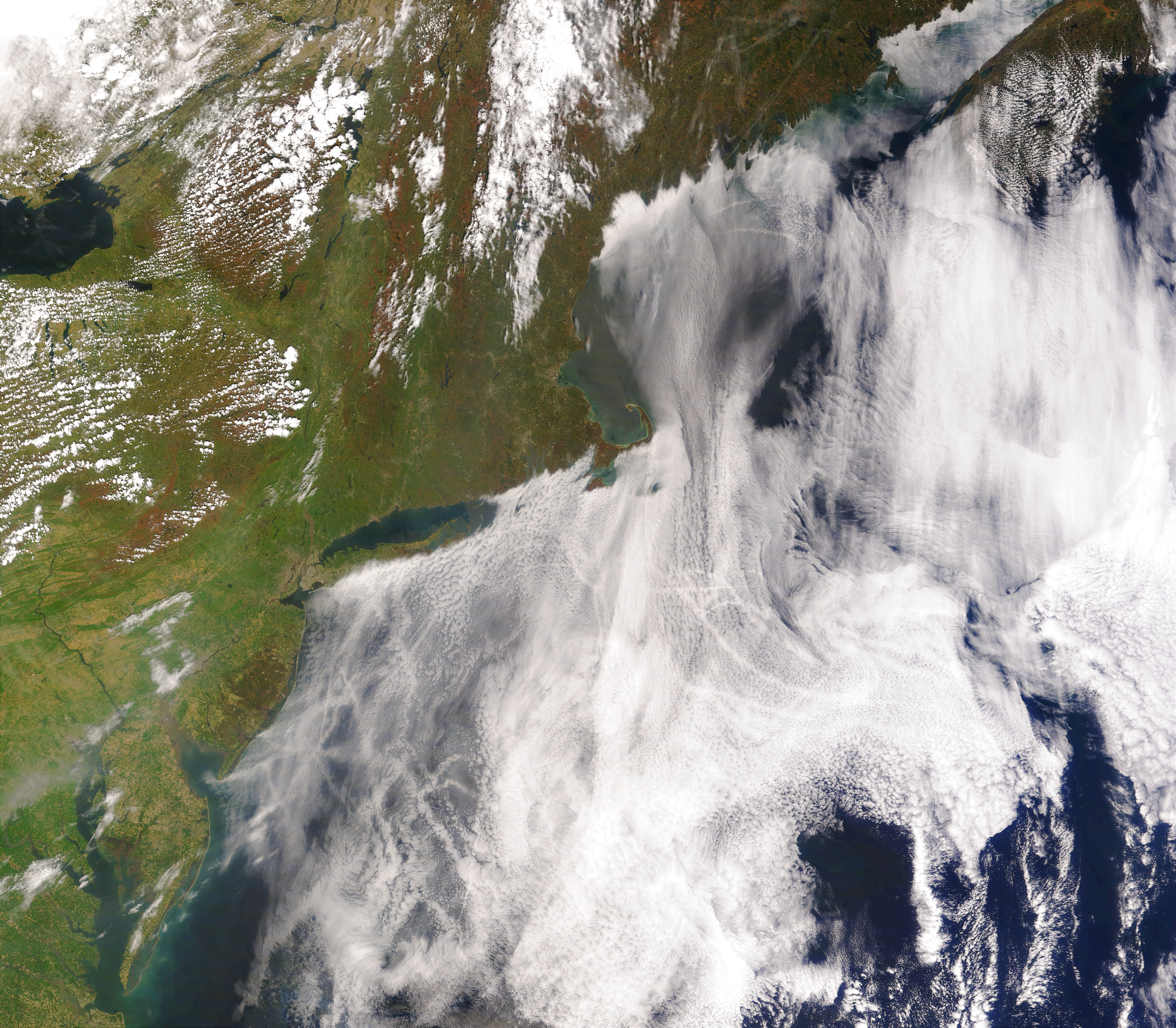
Ship tracks can be seen as lines in these clouds over the Atlantic Ocean on the East Coast of the United States, an example of the Twomey effect.

The Twomey effect describes how additional cloud condensation nuclei (CCN), possibly from anthropogenic pollution, may increase the amount of solar radiation reflected by clouds. This is an indirect effect (or radiative forcing) by such particles, as distinguished from direct effects (forcing) due to enhanced scattering or absorbing radiation by such particles not in clouds.

Cloud droplets normally form on aerosol particles that serve as CCN. Increasing the number density of CCN can lead to formation of more cloud droplets with a smaller size.

The increase in number density increases the optical depth of the cloud, which results in an increase in the cloud albedo making clouds appear whiter. Satellite imagery often shows trails of cloud, or of enhanced brightness of cloud, behind ocean-going ships due to this effect. The decrease in global mean absorption of solar radiation due to increases in CCN concentrations exerts a cooling influence on climate; the global average magnitude of this effect over the industrial era is estimated as between −0.3 and −1.8 W/m^{2}.

== Derivation ==
The mechanism of the Twomey effect was first described by Sean A. Twomey in 1974. Assume a uniform cloud that extends infinitely in the horizontal plane, also assume that the particle size distribution peaks near an average value of $\bar{r}$.

The formula for the optical depth of a cloud is

$$\tau=2\pi\;\! h\bar{r}^{2} N$$

where $\tau$ is the optical depth, $h$ is cloud thickness, $\bar{r}$ is the average particle size, and $N$ is the number density of cloud droplets.

The formula for the liquid water content of a cloud is

$$LWC = \frac{4}{3} \pi\bar{r}^{3}\rho_L N$$

where $\rho_L$ is the density of water.

Taking our assumptions into account we can combine the previous two equations to yield

$$\tau= \frac{3}{2} \frac{h \, LWC}{\rho_L \bar{r}}$$

To derive the effect of changing $N$ while keeping $h$, $\rho_L$ and $LWC$ constant, from the last equation we can write

$$\tau \propto \frac{1}{\bar{r}}$$

and from the equation for $LWC$ we can write

$$\bar{r}^{3} \propto \frac{1}{N}$$

therefore

$$\tau \propto N^{1/3}$$

This illustrates the Twomey Effect mathematically, that is, for a constant liquid water content, $LWC$, increasing the number density of cloud droplets, $N$, increases the optical depth of the cloud.

== See also ==
- Albrecht effect
- Sulfate
- Aerosols and soot
- Contrail

== Bibliography ==
- Hartmann, Dennis L. Global Physical Climatology. Amsterdam: Elsevier, 2016. Print.
- Twomey, S. (December 1974). "Pollution and the planetary albedo". Atmos. Environ. 8 (12): 1251–56. Bibcode:1974AtmEn...8.1251T. doi:10.1016/0004-6981(74)90004-3.
- Twomey, S. (July 1977). "The Influence of Pollution on the Shortwave Albedo of Clouds" (PDF). J. Atmos. Sci. 34 (7): 1149–52. Bibcode:1977JAtS...34.1149T. doi:10.1175/1520-0469(1977)034<1149:TIOPOT>2.0.CO;2.
- Rosenfeld, D. (2006). "Aerosol-Cloud Interactions Control of Earth Radiation and Latent Heat Release Budgets". Space Sci Rev. 125 (1–4): 149–57. Bibcode:2006SSRv..125..149R. doi:10.1007/s11214-006-9053-6. S2CID 122885098.
- Lohmann, U. (2006). "Aerosol Effects on Clouds and Climate" (PDF). Space Sci Rev. 125 (1–4): 129–37. Bibcode:2006SSRv..125..129L. doi:10.1007/s11214-006-9051-8. hdl:20.500.11850/24256. S2CID 121796083.
