= John Latham (physicist) =

British atmosphere and climate physicist, poet (1937–2021)

Prof. Latham
- John
- Born: 21 July 1937; Frodsham (Cheshire)
- Died: 27 April 2021 (aged 83)
- Citizenship: British
- Education: Physics
- Alma mater: Imperial College London
- Known for: Cloud and thunderstorm electrification (temperature gradient theory); marine cloud brightening (MCB)
- Spouse: Ann Bromley
- Children: Rob, Mike, David, Rebecca
- Scientific career
- Fields: Climate Physics
- Workplaces: UMIST, University of Manchester, NCAR Boulder Colorado
- Doctoral advisor: John (BJ) Mason

John Latham (21 July 1937 – 27 April 2021) was a British physicist and professor emeritus at the University of Manchester, known for his work on atmospheric electricity and, later in his career, climate engineering. He was also an accomplished poet.

== Biography ==
Latham obtained a PhD on thunderstorm electrification from Imperial College London, where he was supervised by John Mason. In 1961, he moved to Umist, now part of Manchester University, to take up a lectureship and founded the Atmospheric Physics research group. In 1988, he was hired as a senior research associate in ESSL/MMM at the National Center for Atmospheric Research (NCAR) in Colorado.

== Scientific achievements ==
Latham is best known for his work on thunderstorm electrification and marine cloud brightening, a form of geoengineering which relies on seawater sprayed from ships. In collaboration with Stephen Salter he developed a scheme involving Flettner vessels. One of his major contributions to cloud formation theory came in 1979, with an emphasis on droplet growth and microphysics as modelled in warm clouds, namely those clouds that comprise water vapour and the microscopic droplets that begin to condense from it, rather than ice. A key problem in cloud physics was how to explain the rapid formation of droplets (something none of the models at that time were able to explain). Latham's hypothesis of “inhomogeneous mixing” involved discrete segments of dry air being transported into the clouds: these drier segments caused the complete evaporation of adjacent droplets, while droplets further away remained immune from the process; the fact that the cloud thereby contains fewer droplets explains why competition for the available water vapour in the cloud is reduced, allowing the largest drops to increase in size much faster than expected.

In his academic career, he supervised over twenty-five doctoral students, the first of whom was David Stow.

== Literary achievements ==
Latham was also a talented prose writer, playwright and prize-winning poet. He won first prize in over twenty poetry competitions, with the title poem for one of his later collections (entitled 'From Professor Murasaki’s Notebooks on the Effects of Lightning on the Human Body') gaining second prize in the UK’s 2006 National Poetry Competition. He published six full collections of poetry in all and broadcast a number of radio plays on BBC Radio 4.

Latham's poetry is characterised by the kind of close observation typical of a scientist, combined with a natural ability to generate "a strikingly original angle of vision” whose metaphors "hang around in the mind long after you’ve read them”. His poems received positive reviews from poets Ian McMillan, Peter Porter and John Greening, and he was published and/or reviewed in many literary outlets (including the Observer and Poetry Review). His later work focused more intently on the themes of ageing and memory, a significant feature of his writing as dementia took hold, complicating the latter years of his life.
