= Albrecht effect =

The Albrecht effect describes how a larger density of cloud condensation nuclei (CCN), possibly from anthropogenic pollution, may increase cloud lifetime and hence increase the amount of solar radiation reflected from clouds. Because it does not directly interact with incoming or outgoing radiation, it has an indirect effect on climate.

Aerosol particles act as CCNs creating more droplets of a smaller size. These take more time to coalesce to raindrop size (> 100 μm), reducing precipitation efficiency and hence increasing the lifetime of the cloud. The increased scattering of incoming radiation leads to a cooling of −0.3 to −1.4 W/m^{2}. This effect is not as well understood as the Twomey effect.

There are many other effects, indirect and semi-direct aerosol effects resulting in a large uncertainty in the radiative forcing due to aerosols.

== See also ==
- Particulates and soot

== Bibliography ==
- Albrecht, B.A. (1989). "Aerosols, Cloud Microphysics, and Fractional Cloudiness". Science. 245 (4923): 1227–30. Bibcode:1989Sci...245.1227A. doi:10.1126/science.245.4923.1227. PMID 17747885. S2CID 46152332.
- Lohmann, U. (2006). "Aerosol Effects on Clouds and Climate" (PDF). Space Sci Rev. 125 (1–4): 129–137. Bibcode:2006SSRv..125..129L. doi:10.1007/s11214-006-9051-8. hdl:20.500.11850/24256. S2CID 121796083.
- Rosenfeld, D. (2006). "Aerosol-Cloud Interactions Control of Earth Radiation and Latent Heat Release Budgets". Space Sci Rev. 125 (1–4): 149–157. Bibcode:2006SSRv..125..149R. doi:10.1007/s11214-006-9053-6. S2CID 122885098.
