= Anthropogenic cloud =

Cloud induced or caused by human activity

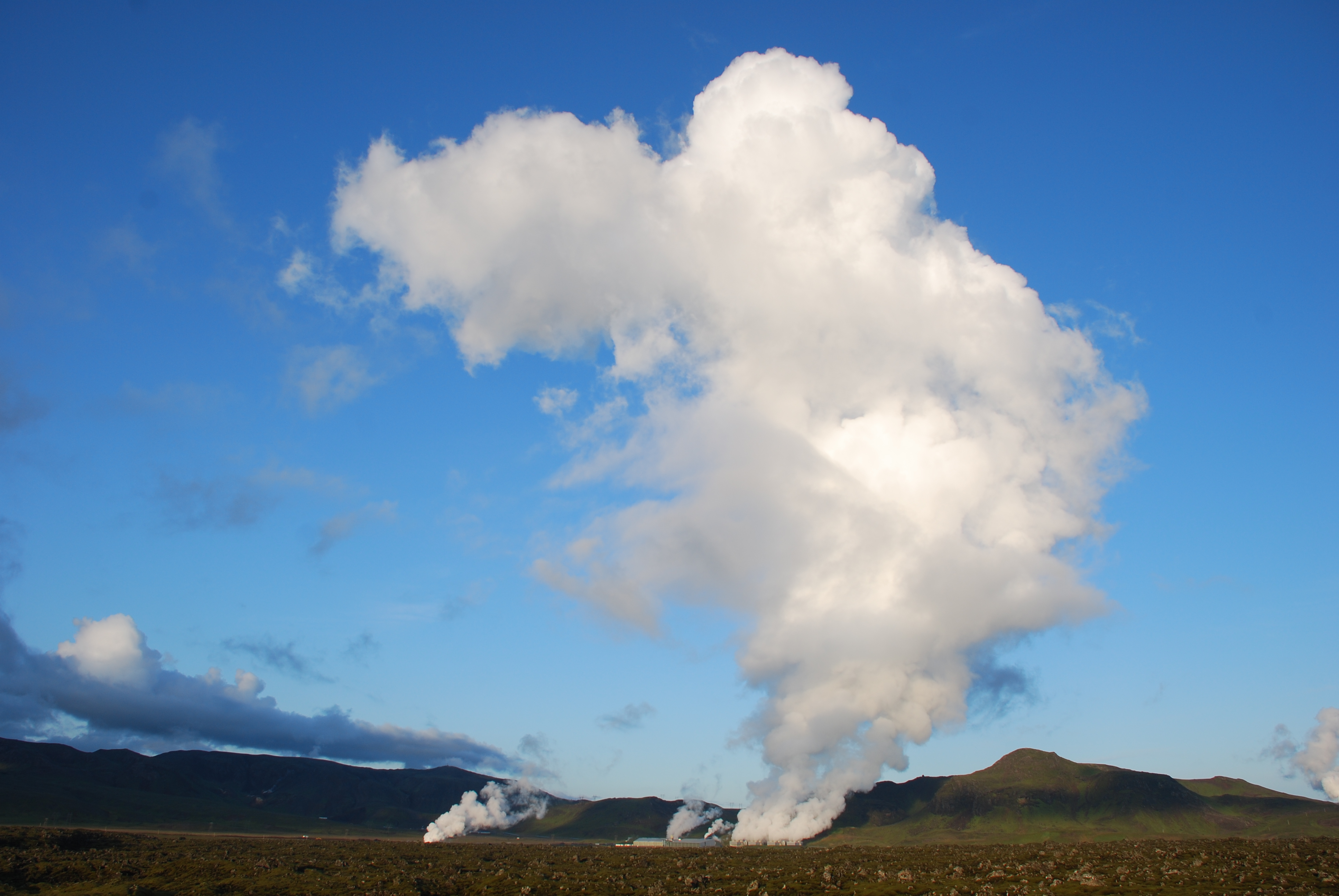
Cumulus homogenitus produced by the emissions of the geothermal power station located in Nesjavellir (Iceland, August 2009).

A homogenitus, anthropogenic or artificial cloud is a cloud induced by human activity. Although most clouds covering the sky have a purely natural origin, since the beginning of the Industrial Revolution, the use of fossil fuels and water vapor and other gases emitted by nuclear, thermal and geothermal power plants yield significant alterations of the local weather conditions. These new atmospheric conditions can thus enhance cloud formation.

Various methods have been proposed for creating and utilizing this weather phenomenon. Experiments have also been carried out for various studies. For example, Russian scientists have been studying artificial clouds for more than 50 years. But, by far the greatest number of anthropogenic clouds are airplane contrails (condensation trails) and rocket trails.

== Anthropogenesis ==
Three conditions are needed to form an anthropogenic cloud:

1. The air must be near saturation of its water vapor,
2. The air must be cooled to the dew point temperature with respect to water (or ice) to condensate (or sublimate) part of the water vapor,
3. The air must contain condensation nuclei, small solid particles, where condensation/sublimation starts.

The current use of fossil fuels enhances any of these three conditions. First, fossil fuel combustion generates water vapor. Additionally, this combustion also generates the formation of small solid particles that can act as condensation nuclei. Finally, all the combustion processes emit energy that enhance vertical upward movements.

Despite all the processes involving the combustion of fossil fuels, only some human activities, such as, thermal power plants, commercial aircraft or chemical industries modify enough the atmospheric conditions to produce clouds that can use the qualifier homogenitus due to its anthropic origin.

== Cloud classification ==
The International Cloud Atlas published by the World Meteorological Organization compiles the proposal made by Luke Howard at the beginning of the 19th century, and all the subsequent modifications. Each cloud has a name in Latin, and clouds are classified according to their genus, species, and variety:

- There are 10 genera (plural of genus) (e.g. cumulus, stratus, etc...).
- There is a number of species for these genera that describe the form, the dimensions, internal structure, and type of vertical movement (e.g. stratus nebulosus for stratus covering the whole sky). Species are mutually exclusive.
- Species can further be divided into varieties that describe their transparence or their arrangement (e.g. stratus nebulosus opacus for thick stratus covering the whole sky).

Further terms can be added to describe the origin of the cloud. Homogenitus is a suffix that signifies that a cloud originates from human activity. For instance, Cumulus originated by human activity is called Cumulus homogenitus and abbreviated as CUh. If a homogenitus cloud of one genus changes to another genus type, it is termed a homomutatus cloud.

== Generating process ==
The international cloud classification divides the different genera into three main groups of clouds according to their altitude:

- High clouds
- Middle clouds
- Low clouds

Homogenitus clouds can be generated by different sources in the high and low levels.

=== High homogenitus ===
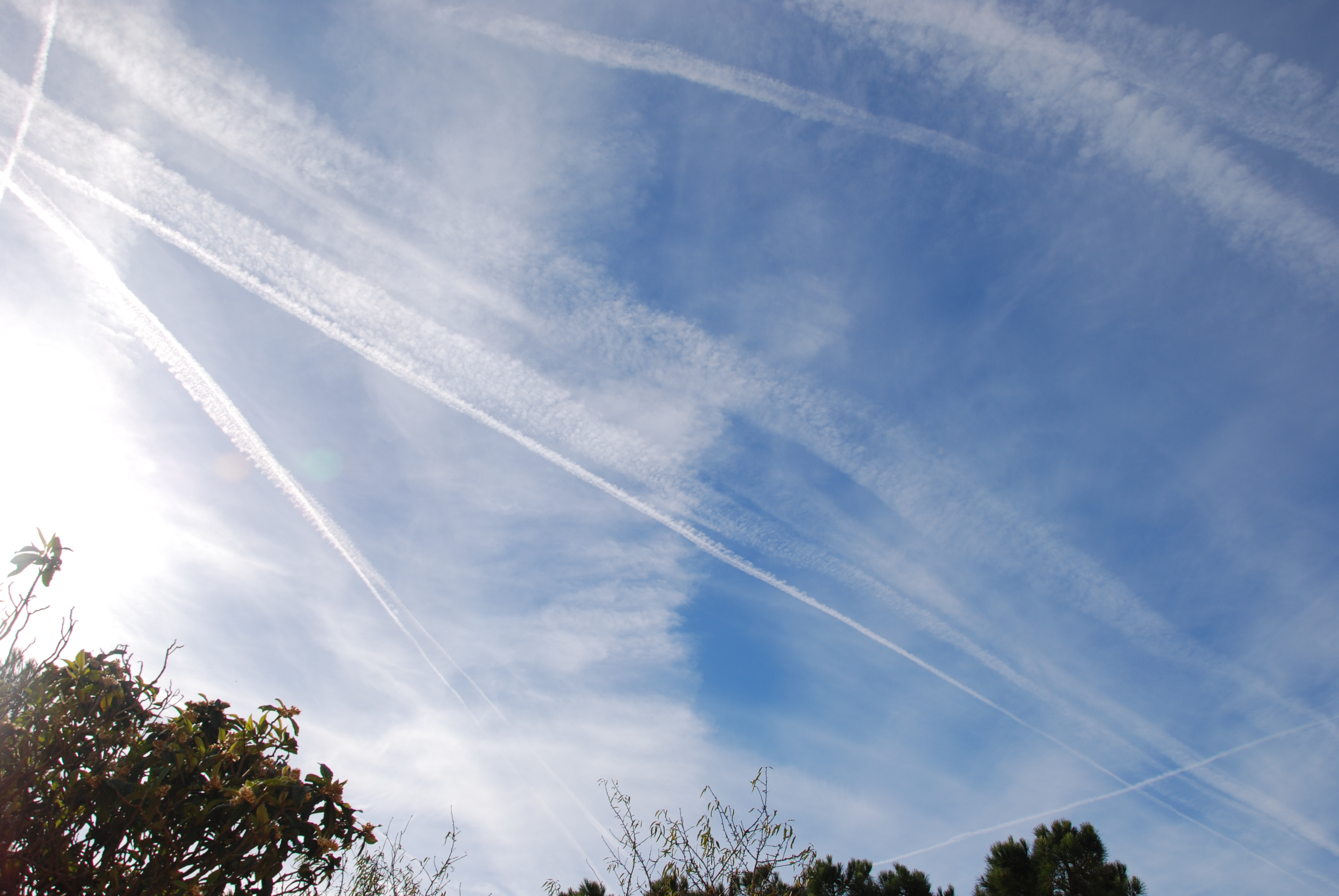
Condensation trails with Cirrocumulus homogenitus (Cch) and Cirrostratus homogenitus (Csh) observed over Barcelona (Spain, November 2010).

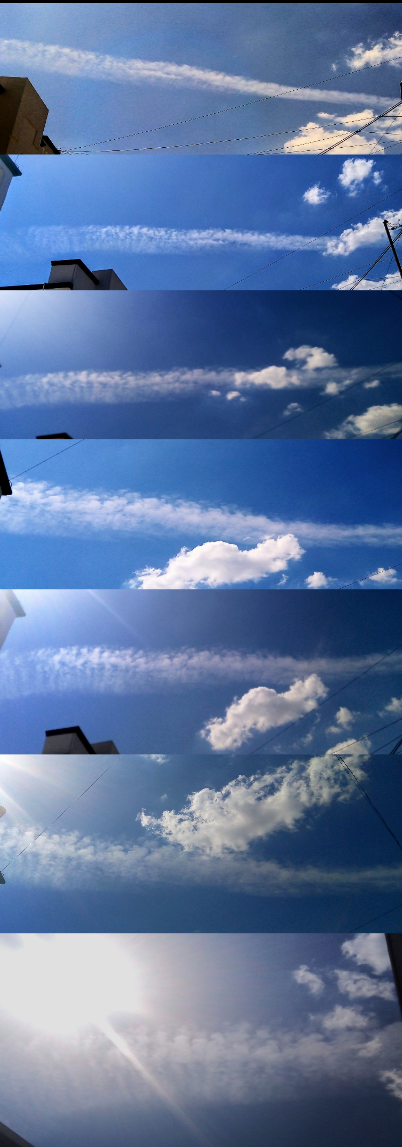
Sequence of photos showing how a contrail turns into a cirrocumulus homogenitus

Despite the fact that the three genera of high clouds, Cirrus, Cirrocumulus and Cirrostratus, form at the top of the troposphere, far from the earth surface, they may have an anthropogenic origin. In this case, the process that causes their formation is almost always the same: commercial and military aircraft flight. Exhaust products from the combustion of the kerosene (or sometimes gasoline) expelled by engines provide water vapor to this region of the troposphere.

In addition, the strong contrast between the cold air of the high troposphere layers and the warm and moist air ejected by aircraft engines causes rapid deposition of water vapor, forming small ice crystals. This process is also enhanced by the presence of abundant nuclei of condensation produced as a result of combustion. These clouds are commonly known as condensation trails (contrails), and are initially lineal cirrus clouds that could be called Cirrus homogenitus (Cih). The large temperature difference between the air exhausted and the ambient air generates small-scale convection processes, which favor the evolution of the condensation trails to Cirrocumulus homogenitus (Cch).

Depending on the atmospheric conditions at the upper part of the troposphere, where the plane is flying, these high clouds rapidly disappear or persist. When the air is dry and stable, the water rapidly evaporates inside the contrails and can only observed up to several hundreds of meters from the plane. On the other hand, if humidity is high enough, there exists an ice oversaturation, and the homogenitus get wide and can exist for hours. In the later case, depending on the wind conditions, Cch may evolve to Cirrus homogenitus (Cih) or Cirrostratus homogenitus (Csh). The existence and persistence of these three types of high anthropogenic clouds may indicate the approximation of air stability. In some cases, when there is a large density of air traffic, these high homogenitus may inhibit the formation of natural high clouds, because the contrails capture most of the water vapor.

=== Low homogenitus ===
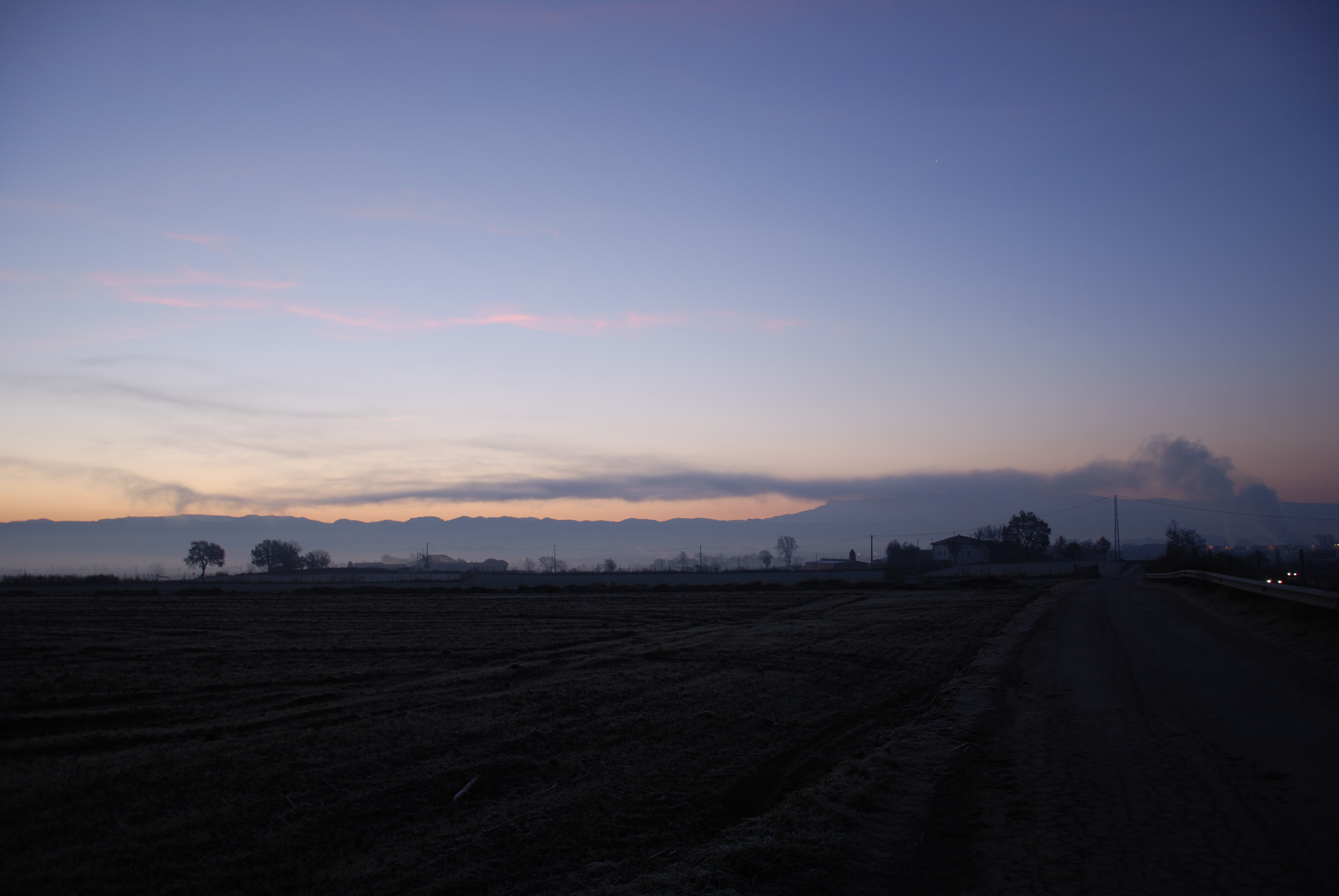
Stratus homogenitus (Sth) formed due to the emissions of a dairy factory near Gurb (Spain, February 2011).

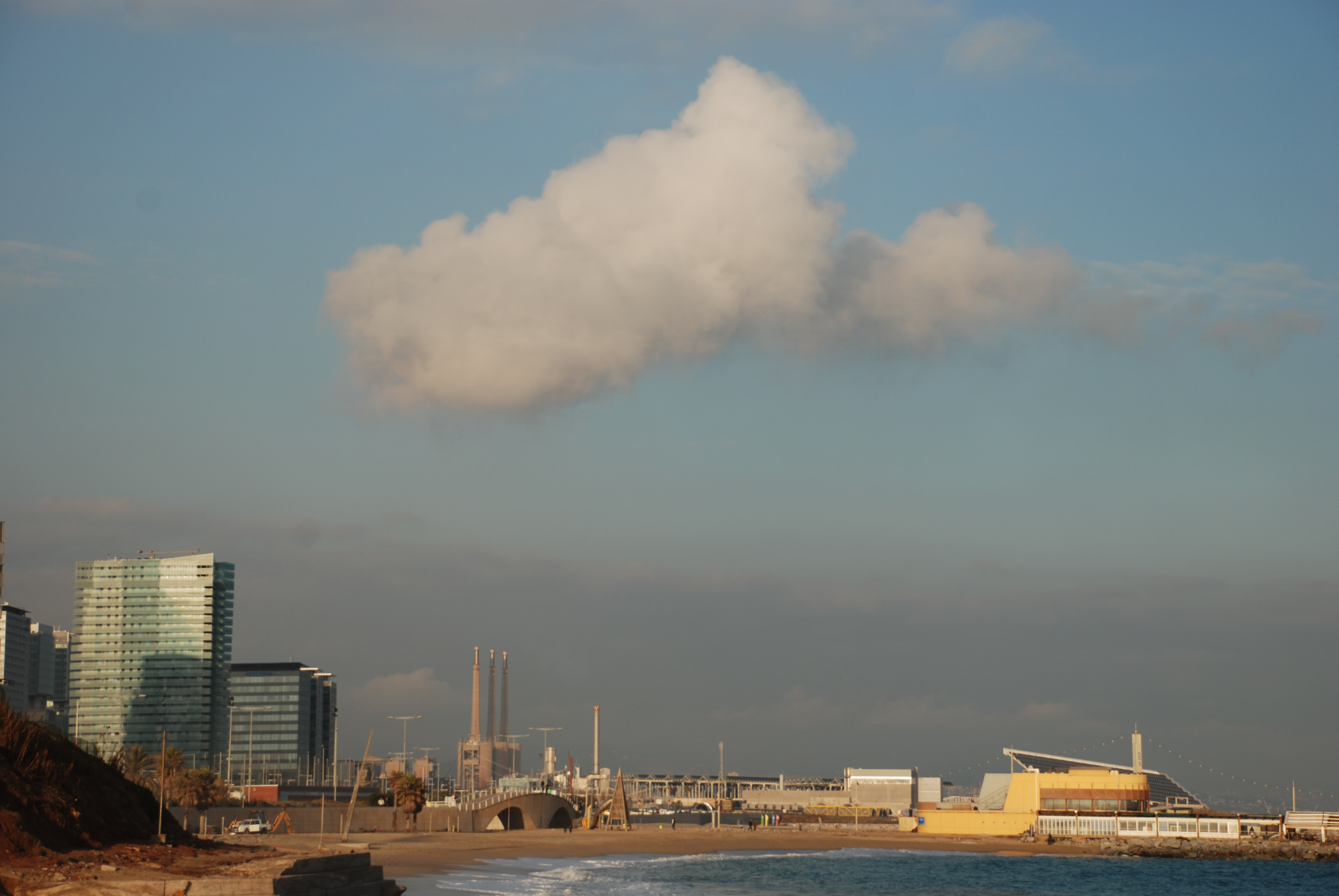
Cumulus homogenitus (Cuh) formed due to the emissions of the thermal power plant in Sant Adrià del Besós, Spain (December 2008).

The lowest part of the atmosphere is the region most influenced by human activity, through the emission of water vapor, warm air, and condensation nuclei. When the atmosphere is stable, the additional contribution of warm and moist air from emissions enhances fog formation or produces layers of Stratus homogenitus (Sth). If the air is not stable, this warm and moist air emitted by human activities creates a convective movement that can reach the lifted condensation level, producing an anthropogenic cumulus cloud, or Cumulus homogenitus (Cuh). This type of clouds may be also observed over the polluted air covering some cities and industrial areas under high-pressure conditions.

Stratocumulus homogenitus (Sch) are anthropogenic clouds that may be formed by the evolution of Sth in a slightly unstable atmosphere or of Cuh in a stable atmosphere.

Finally, the large, towering Cumulonimbus (Cb) presents such a great vertical development that only in some particular cases can they be created by anthropic causes. For instance, large fires may cause the formation of flammagenitus clouds, which can evolve to Cumulonimbus flammagenitus (CbFg, or CbFgh if anthropogenic); very large explosions, such as nuclear explosions, produce mushroom clouds, a distinctive subtype of cumulonimbus flammagenitus.

== Experiments ==
Anthropogenic cloud can be generated in laboratory or in situ to study its properties or use it for other purpose. A cloud chambers is a sealed environment containing a supersaturated vapor of water or alcohol. When a charged particle (for example, an alpha or beta particle) interacts with the mixture, the fluid is ionized. The resulting ions act as condensation nuclei, around which a mist will form (because the mixture is on the point of condensation). Cloud seeding, a form of weather modification, is the attempt to change the amount or type of precipitation that falls from clouds, by dispersing substances into the air that serve as cloud condensation or ice nuclei, which alter the microphysical processes within the cloud. The usual intent is to increase precipitation (rain or snow), but hail and fog suppression are also widely practiced in airports.

Numerous experiments have been done with those two methods in the troposphere. At higher altitudes, NASA studied inducing noctilucent clouds in 1960 and 2009. In 1984 satellites from three nations took part in an artificial cloud experiment as part of a study of solar winds and comets. In 1969, a European satellite released and ignited barium and copper oxide at an altitude of 43,000 miles in space to create a 2,000 mile mauve and green plume visible for 22 minutes. It was part of a study of magnetic and electric fields.

Plans to create artificial clouds over soccer tournaments in the Middle East were suggested in 2011 as a way to help shade and cool down Qatar's 2022 FIFA World Cup.

== Influence on climate ==
There are many studies dealing with the importance and effects of high anthropic clouds (Penner, 1999; Minna et al., 1999, 2003–2004; Marquart et al., 2002–2003; Stuber and Foster, 2006, 2007), but not about anthropic clouds in general. For the particular case of Cia due to contrails, IPCC estimates positive radiative forcing around 0.01 Wm^{−2}.

When annotating the weather data, using the suffix that indicates the cloud origin allows differentiating these clouds from the ones with natural origin. Once this notation is established, after several years of observations, the influence of homogenitus on earth climate will be clearly analyzed.

== See also ==
- Contrail
- Chemtrail conspiracy theory
- Environmental impact of aviation
- Global dimming

== Bibliography ==
- Howard, L. 1804: On the modification of clouds and the principles of their production, suspension and destruction: being the substance of an essay read before the Askesian Society in session 1802–03. J. Taylor. London.
- IPCC 2007 AR4 WGI WGIII.
- Marquart, S, and B. Mayer, 2002: Towards a reliable GCM estimation on contrail radiative forcing. Geophys. Res. Lett., 29, 1179, doi:10.1029/2001GL014075.
- Marquart S., Ponater M., Mager F., and Sausen R., 2003: Future Development of contrail Cover, Optical Depth, and Radiative Forcing: Impacts of Increasing Air Traffic and Climate Change. Journal of climatology, 16, 2890–2904
- Mazon J, Costa M, Pino D, Lorente J, 2012: Clouds caused by human activities. Weather, 67, 11, 302–306.
- Meteorological glossary of American meteorological Society: http://glossary.ametsoc.org/?p=1&query=pyrocumulus&submit=Search
- Minnis P., Kirk J. and Nordeen L., Weaver S., 2003. Contrail Frequency over the United States from Surface Observations. American Meteorology Society, 16, 3447–3462
- Minnis, P., J. Ayers, R. Palikonda, and D. Phan, 2004: Contrails, cirrus trends, and climate. J. Climate, 14, 555–561.
- Norris, J. R., 1999: On trends and possible artifacts in global ocean cloud cover between 1952 and 1995. J. Climate, 12, 1864–1870.
- Penner, J., D. Lister, D. Griggs, D. Dokken, and M. McFarland, 1999: Special Report on Aviation and the Global Atmosphere. Cambridge University Press, 373 pp.
- Stuber, N., and P. Forster, 2007: The impact of diurnal variations of air traffic on contrail radiative forcing. Atmos. Chem. Phys., 7, 3153–3162.
- Stuber, N., and P. Forster, G. Rädel, and K. Shine, 2006: The importance of the diurnal and annual cycle of air traffic for contrail radiative forcing. Nature, 441, 864–867.
- World Meteorological Organization (1975). International Cloud Atlas: Manual on the observation of clouds and other meteors. WMO-No. 407. I (text). Geneva: World Meteorological Organization. ISBN 9263104077.
- World Meteorological Organization (1987). International Cloud Atlas: Manual on the observation of clouds and other meteors. WMO-No. 407. II (plates). Geneva: World Meteorological Organization. pp. 196. ISBN 9263124078.
