= Exploring Climate Cooling Programme =

2025 United Kingdom climate engineering research initiative

The Exploring Climate Cooling Programme is an international research initiative funded by the UK Government’s Advanced Research and Invention Agency focused on researching climate intervention approaches designed to mitigate global warming effects.

The programme aims to build an independent evidence base to evaluate whether various approaches to reduce global surface temperatures could ever be feasible, safe, and governable, and to support future decision-making about those approaches. It investigates techniques that fall within the broader scientific field of solar radiation modification (SRM), as well as approaches to mitigate or prevent catastrophic risks such as Arctic sea ice thickening.

== Initiative ==
Exploring Climate Cooling Programme director Professor Mark Symes expressed the opinion that the mounting risk of climate tipping points— such as the potential collapse of the Atlantic meridional overturning circulation or massive ice sheets— necessitates research into methods that could rapidly cool the planet. Programme leaders, after consulting with hundreds of researchers, claimed that the project was initiated due to the absence of empirical data from real-world physical experiments regarding climate change mitigation efforts, which laboratory simulations and computer models alone cannot provide.

In May 2025, the Advanced Research and Invention Agency (ARIA) allocated £56.8 million in government funding to the Exploring Climate Cooling programme across 22 research projects. This followed an £11 million commitment from the National Environment Research Council (NERC) on April 3, 2025, to a complementary initiative to investigate the potential impacts of solar radiation modification interventions. The two funding streams resulted in the United Kingdom becoming among the largest funders of climate engineering science, at a time when United States contributions were predicted to decrease under the second Donald Trump presidential administration.

=== Projects ===
The programme funds 22 research projects spanning multiple methodologies: computer modelling, monitoring of natural atmospheric processes, and indoor laboratory testing.

It also includes five small-scale outdoor experiments, to provide empirical data which laboratory simulations and computer models alone cannot provide, which include:

- Exploring the feasibility and effectiveness of re-thickening arctic sea ice, with experiments currently taking place in Northern Canada.
- Investigation into approaches to marine cloud brightening, which involves spraying seawater to enhance cloud reflectivity.
- Investigation of the effects on fog and cloud reflectivity of controlled electric discharge.
- Modelling and research into Stratospheric Aerosol Injection, including whether natural mineral dusts could offer safer options for stratospheric cooling to sulfphur-based materials. This involves exposing milligram quantities of candidate materials to the stratosphere, which are then returned to Earth for analysis, with no materials released.

ARIA is also funding two monitoring projects related to cirrus clouds, both grounded in observing and measuring existing atmospheric processes to improve our fundamental understanding of cirrus cloud formation.

All outdoor experiments will be scrutinised by an oversight committee chaired by Prof Piers Forster, a leading climate scientist who is the founding director of the Priestley Centre for Climate Futures at the University of Leeds and a lead author for the Intergovernmental Panel on Climate Change.

ARIA has stated that the programme is not a pathway to deployment of any climate cooling technology, and that determining an approach does not work is considered an equally valid outcome to demonstrating that it does.

All funded project teams have signed an intellectual property pledge committing them to publish all experimental data publicly and to provide royalty-free patent licences for research use.

== Response ==
Critics, including several prominent climate researchers, characterized the solar radiation management experiments to be conducted by the programme as an ill-conceived approach that diverts attention from the essential task of reducing carbon emissions. Senior researchers Michael Mann and Raymond Pierrehumbert characterized the efforts as a "dangerous distraction" from underlying sources of climate change, and akin to "taking aspirin for cancer".

Other researchers have argued for the importance of proceeding with carefully governed experimentation. Writing in The Guardian in January 2026, Cornell University atmospheric scientist Daniele Visioni and Dakota Gruener argued that safe experimentation on reflecting sunlight is both possible and necessary and that “research acts as a guardrail – not a slippery slope”. Climate scientist Ines Camilloni, writing in the same publication, argued that ARIA’s research on governance and ethics, and funding of Global South researchers was a sign of ‘constructive change emerging’ in the field.

== See also ==
- Ethics of terraforming
- Climate change
- Climate interventions
- Solar radiation modification
- Global catastrophic risks
