= Five Ways to Save the World =

- Directed by: Jonathan Barker; Cecilia Hue; Anna Abbott
- Produced by: Karen O'Connor
- Release date: 2006
- Country: United Kingdom
- Language: English

Five Ways to Save the World is a British documentary film on environmental issues related to climate change, released in 2006. The film was made by Karen O'Connor, for the big screen and was shot in the English language to reach an international audience. It includes interviews with five environmental scientists and experts including Paul Crutzen, James Roger Angel, John Latham, Ian Jones, and Klaus Lackner.

The "five ways" proposed are geoengineering techniques:

- space lenses in orbit, to diffract sunlight away from the earth
- cloud seeding with seawater to increase albedo
- sulfur launched into the stratosphere to increase albedo
- ocean fertilization with iron or urea (nitrogen fertilizer)
- artificial trees (see carbon capture and sequestration)

Since the first three methods do not remove carbon dioxide from the atmosphere, they would only reduce global warming but not ocean acidification. Since the last two methods would remove carbon dioxide, they could in theory reduce both global warming and ocean acidification.
