= Cirrus cloud thinning =

Proposed form of climate engineering

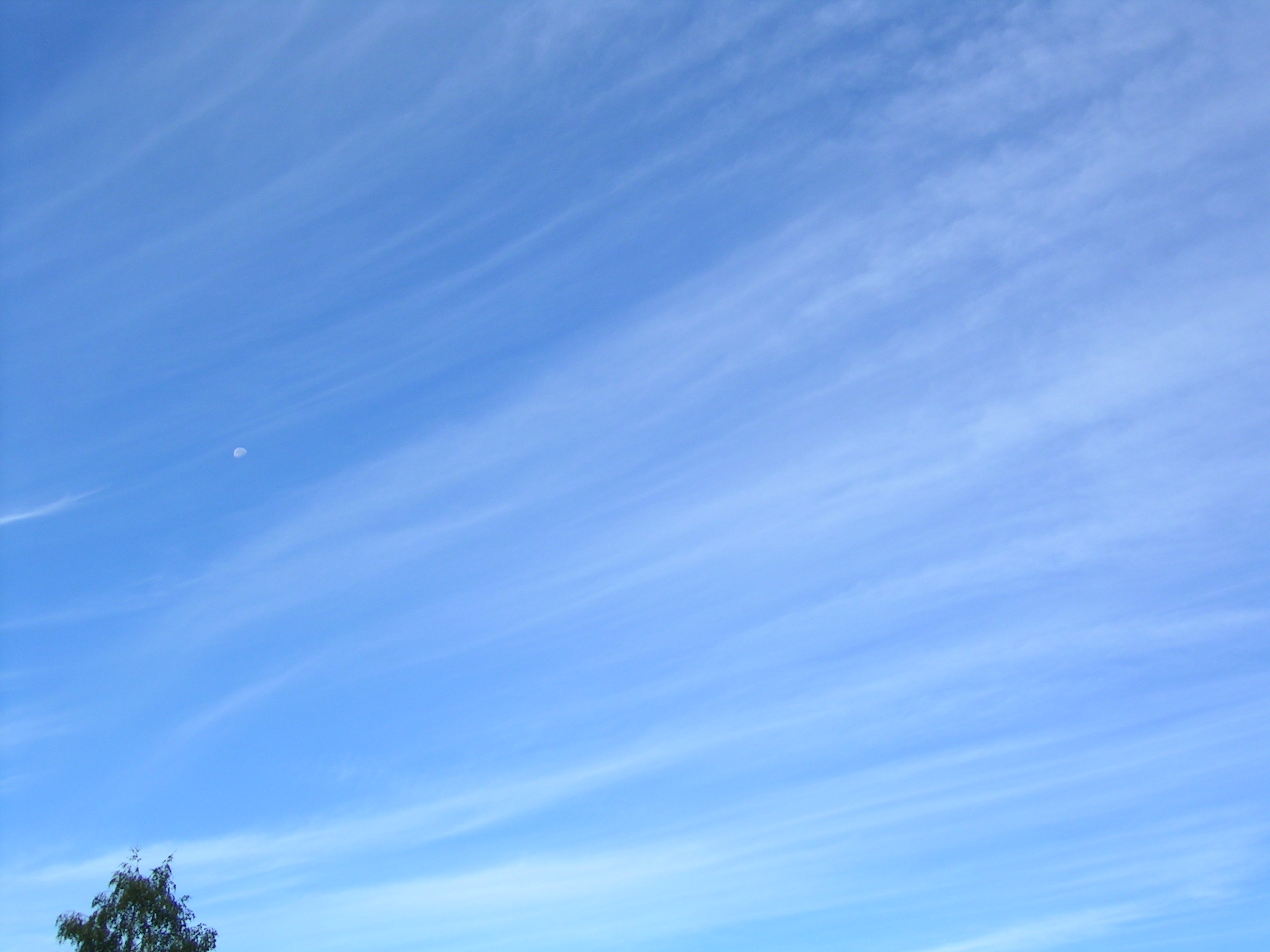
Cirrus clouds, thin high-altitude ice clouds that on average warm the climate

Cirrus cloud thinning (CCT), also called cirrus cloud seeding, is a proposed form of climate engineering that would cool the Earth by making some cirrus clouds thinner and shorter-lived. Most cirrus are thin, high ice clouds that let most sunlight through but trap part of the heat the Earth gives off, so on average they warm the climate. Like glaciogenic cloud seeding, which adds ice-forming particles to clouds to increase rain or snow, CCT would add particles on which ice forms easily to the air where these clouds form, but with the aim of thinning the clouds instead. Although particles would be added, the clouds would end up with fewer but larger ice crystals, which trap less heat and fall out sooner, letting more heat escape to space.

Unlike solar geoengineering proposals such as stratospheric aerosol injection, which would reflect incoming sunlight, CCT acts on the heat leaving the planet, although it is usually discussed alongside them. Its effectiveness is uncertain: computer-model studies range from more than 1 °C of cooling to little or none, and too much seeding could warm the planet instead. The Intergovernmental Panel on Climate Change (IPCC) assessed its cooling effect with low confidence. Possible side effects include changes in rainfall, and a rapid return of warming if seeding were stopped.

== Background ==
=== Why cirrus clouds overall warm the climate ===
Cirrus are clouds made entirely of ice crystals. Most are thin and wispy and form in the upper troposphere, mostly at temperatures below about −38 °C (−36 °F), but some, such as the anvils spreading from the tops of thunderstorms, form from rising liquid or mixed-phase clouds and are often thick. Thin cirrus let much of the sunlight through, while absorbing infrared radiation (heat) rising from the warmer surface below and, being cold, emitting less of it to space. On average, this heat trapping outweighs the cooling from reflected sunlight. The balance depends on a cloud's thickness and height and on the time of day and season; at night and in polar winter, cirrus only trap heat.

=== How ice forms in cirrus ===
Cirrus form in two broad ways. Liquid-origin cirrus form when the droplets of rising liquid or mixed-phase clouds freeze, for example in thunderstorms. In situ cirrus form in air colder than about −38 °C through the processes described below. CCT targets in situ cirrus.

As air rises and cools, its humidity relative to ice increases. The upper troposphere is often supersaturated with respect to ice, containing more water vapour than air in equilibrium with ice, because ice does not form readily. The air contains many aqueous solution droplets, for example of sulfuric acid, but these stay liquid until the humidity relative to ice reaches roughly 140–170%. A small fraction of them, still a large number, then freeze within a short time, producing many small ice crystals. This is homogeneous freezing.

On ice-nucleating particles (ice nuclei) such as mineral dust, ice can form at a much lower humidity. This is heterogeneous nucleation. Ice nuclei are much scarcer than solution droplets, so they produce fewer crystals, which grow larger. The two processes compete: if enough ice nuclei are present, their growing crystals take up the vapour before the humidity reaches the level at which solution droplets freeze. Homogeneous freezing is favoured where air rises quickly, because the humidity then climbs faster than the few crystals can remove it.

== Proposed mechanism ==
CCT was proposed in 2009 by the atmospheric scientists David Mitchell and William Finnegan. Efficient ice nuclei released into the humid air where in situ cirrus would otherwise form by homogeneous freezing would let ice start growing at lower humidity and, through the competition described above, prevent homogeneous freezing. The cloud would end up with fewer, larger crystals.

This would have two effects. First, a cloud whose ice is spread over fewer, larger crystals is optically thinner, even before any ice falls out. It therefore traps less of the heat rising from below, although it also reflects less sunlight. In one high-resolution simulation, this reduction in the number of ice crystals was the primary effect of seeding. Second, larger crystals fall faster, so the cloud loses its ice sooner and becomes thinner and shorter-lived.

Mitchell and Finnegan suggested that commercial aircraft could release the seeding material. No particular seeding material has been settled on: model studies have mostly assumed idealised ice nuclei, and one study of releases along flight routes assumed particles of bismuth tri-iodide. Because the particles fall out together with the ice that forms on them, seeding would have to be continual.

== Cooling potential ==
=== Finding suitable clouds ===
CCT can only work where in situ cirrus would otherwise form by homogeneous freezing, and how common such clouds are is uncertain. Aircraft measurements found that most ice crystals in the cirrus sampled had formed on mineral dust and metal-containing particles, indicating that heterogeneous nucleation dominated. Satellite measurements suggest that cirrus affected by homogeneous freezing are common over the oceans outside the tropics in winter, and may account for much of the radiative effect of cirrus there.

=== Risk of overseeding ===
Adding particles to clouds that already form mainly on natural ice nuclei, or adding too many, can create more ice crystals rather than fewer, making clouds thicker or longer-lived and warming the climate instead of cooling it. This is called overseeding. In one model, seeding produced strong warming when cirrus were assumed to form only on natural ice nuclei. In another, the largest releases along flight routes caused overseeding and strong warming. In the first study, cooling depended on choosing a suitable seeding concentration.

=== Results from simulations ===
Climate-model studies disagree widely on how much CCT could cool the planet, with results ranging from more than 1 °C to no significant cooling. Much of this spread comes from how the studies represent ice formation, seeding and the clouds themselves. Some found substantial cooling, about 1.4 °C in one study, with the strongest cooling for a moderate amount of seeding. Another, whose model included competition between freezing processes, crystals already present and the full range of updraft speeds, found that no seeding strategy produced significant cooling, because seeding increased cirrus cover and made the crystals smaller.

Results also depend on how the particles are delivered and on the scale simulated. Most global studies spread seeding particles evenly around the globe; when they were instead released from aircraft along existing flight routes, far fewer reached the clouds where they were needed, and a noticeable effect required hundreds of times more material. A high-resolution simulation of winter cirrus over the Arctic found that seeding reduced the number of ice crystals and let more heat escape to space.

== Comparison with other approaches ==
Stratospheric aerosol injection and marine cloud brightening, forms of solar geoengineering, would reflect more sunlight. CCT would instead let more heat escape, counteracting greenhouse warming more directly. It would also work at night and in polar winter, with its strongest cooling at high latitudes, which some researchers suggest could help protect Arctic sea ice. Reflecting sunlight tends to weaken the global water cycle, whereas modelling studies find that CCT would strengthen it.

CCT is also less well understood. Whereas stratospheric aerosol injection can draw on evidence from large volcanic eruptions, which act as a natural analogue, a 2021 report by the US National Academies of Sciences, Engineering, and Medicine concluded that the efficacy of CCT is unknown because of very limited understanding of cirrus cloud properties, and that the few existing climate model simulations had given contradictory results.

== Potential side effects ==
- Rainfall changes. Models suggest that more rain would fall globally, and that some monsoons, such as the Indian monsoon, could strengthen.
- Effects beyond the seeded area. Seeding part of the globe can shift circulation and rainfall elsewhere; in one model, seeding only the Southern Hemisphere moved the tropical rain belt northward.
- Response of other clouds. Models disagree on how lower clouds and humidity would respond, which affects how much cooling would be achieved.
- Rapid return of warming. Mitchell and Finnegan suggested that the climate might return to its normal state within months of seeding stopping, so any warming it had been masking would quickly reappear.

== See also ==
- Cirrus clouds
- Cloud seeding
- Solar radiation modification
- Climate engineering
