= Stardust Solutions =

American solar geoengineering company

- Type: Private
- Industry: Geoengineering
- Founded: 2023; 3 years ago
- Founders: Yanai Yedvab; Amyad Spector; Eli Waxman
- Headquarters: Delaware, U.S.
- Number of locations: 2
- Area served: Worldwide
- Key people: Yanai Yedvab (CEO); Amyad Spector (CPO); Eli Waxman (lead scientist)
- Number of employees: 25 (2026)
- Subsidiaries: Stardust Labs
- Website: stardustsrt.com

Stardust Solutions is a for-profit Stratospheric aerosol injection, solar geoengineering, climate change startup company. It publicly claims that its sunlight reflective material is safe for humans and the environment and can reflect significant amounts of the Sun's rays with little or no damage to the atmosphere. It says it will not deploy these particles on its own and that it sees its mission as offering research and technology options for governments to consider to buy humanity more time to address the climate crisis. Observers note that Stardust's for-profit model exacerbates public distrust, undermines legitimate research, and adopts a secretive defense procurement model that excludes public participation, creating an undemocratic path toward solar geoengineering.

Unilateral deployment without international consensus risks triggering geopolitical frictions due to conflicting regional climate preferences.

== History ==
Stardust Solutions is a U.S. company registered in Delaware, operating an Israeli subsidiary, Stardust Labs, with a laboratory located in Ness Ziona. It was founded in Israel in 2023 by Yanai Yedvab, Amyad Spector, and Eli Waxman. CEO Yanai Yedvab served as deputy chief scientist at the Israel Atomic Energy Commission from 2011 to 2015 and previously headed the physics division at the Shimon Peres Negev Nuclear Research Center. Chief Product Officer Amyad Spector is a physicist who worked on government R&D projects from 2012 to 2022 and was formerly employed at the Shimon Peres Negev Nuclear Research Center, while lead scientist Eli Waxman is an astrophysicist at the Weizmann Institute of Science. The company has 25 employees.

The company raised $75 million across two funding rounds from over a dozen investment firms, consisting of a $15 million seed round funded mainly by Canadian-Israeli VC firm Awz Ventures and SolarEdge, and a $60 million second round, led by Lowercarbon Capital, controlled by Chris Sacca, alongside Exor, controlled by the Agnelli family, Matt Cohler, Future Ventures, controlled by Steve Jurvetson, and Lauder Partners, controlled by the Lauder family. This is the largest investment to date in a company developing solar-radiation modification to reduce global temperatures. The company works on governance issues through the consulting firm WestExec Advisors, and the law firm Holland & Knight.

== Technology ==
Most solar radiation modification research is based on the concept of creating a layer of sulfuric acid in the stratosphere, which damages the ozone layer and causes acid rain. Stardust claims that its particles are engineered to deliver the reflectivity effect without these drawbacks. The company developed two particles to reflect sunlight in the upper atmosphere. One consists of amorphous silica coated to prevent interaction with atmospheric gases, while the other features an amorphous silica shell around a calcium carbonate core. According to the company, dispersing 10 million tons of particles over several years is projected to reduce temperatures by 1.5°C, and the first phases of cooling would cost approximately $10 billion. While the Agency for Toxic Substances and Disease Registry indicates no health risks at current environmental levels, scientists require further research on potential respiratory effects.

== Potential risks ==
Janos Pasztor, former climate adviser to then-U.N. Secretary General Ban Ki-moon, who was hired by Stardust to report on its regulatory issues and public scrutiny steps, criticized the company’s actions. He warned that a lack of strong regulations could allow a billionaire with close ties to a government—specifically the U.S.—to initiate global cooling unilaterally, bypassing international discussion and consensus. Alan Robock, Rutgers University researcher, warns that unilateral geoengineering deployment in the absence of international consensus risks triggering geopolitical frictions due to conflicting regional climate preferences. University at Buffalo researcher Holly Buck argues that Stardust's for-profit model exacerbates public distrust and undermines legitimate geoengineering research. American University researcher Duncan McLaren suggests the company adopts a secretive defense procurement model that excludes public participation, creating an undemocratic path toward solar geoengineering. Solar-radiation modification requires indefinite particle replacement to prevent "termination shock"—a sudden, rapid temperature increase if the cooling stops. Stardust claims this risk can be decreased by gradually tapering off particle deployment as decarbonization progresses.

In April 2026, Stardust released two documents on Solar radiation modification (SRM). The first is an outline of guiding principles explaining the necessity of SRM research. The second is a framework for researching SRM and conducting testing safely. It states that Stardust focuses strictly on research rather than deployment, and commits to preventing environmental harm during tests scheduled for 2026. Subject to criticism for its secrecy, the company promised to publish peer-reviewed scientific papers, detailing all data and results, including negative findings, promptly after scientific validation. The documents assert that any deployment must rely on international decision-making, anticipating that governments will establish a regulatory framework similar to the Montreal Protocol.

The company has submitted a patent application. In May 2026, Stardust published two white papers and six preprint articles, in collaboration with research university scientists from Israel, Europe, and the USA.
