= Mikhail Budyko =

Soviet-Russian climatologist (1920 – 2001)

- Михаил Будыко
- Born: 20 January 1920; Gomel, Byelorussian SSR, Soviet Union (now Belarus)
- Died: 10 December 2001 (aged 81); Saint Petersburg, Russia
- Education: Leningrad Polytechnic Institute, 1942)
- Known for: Important research on global climate and the Snowball Earth hypotheses
- Scientific career
- Fields: Climatology
- Workplaces: Main Geophysical Observatory (1972–1975); Russian State Hydrological Institute (1975–2000)

Mikhail Ivanovich Budyko (Note: Belarusian: Міхаіл Іванавіч Будыка, romanized: Michail Ivanavič Budyka Russian: Михаил Иванович Будыко) (20 January 1920 – 10 December 2001) was a Soviet and Russian climatologist and one of the founders of physical climatology. He pioneered studies on global climate and calculated the temperature of Earth using a simple physical model of equilibrium in which the incoming solar radiation absorbed by the Earth's system is balanced by the energy re-radiated to space as thermal energy.

Budyko's groundbreaking book, Heat Balance of the Earth's Surface (Тепловой баланс земной поверхности), published in 1956, transformed climatology from a qualitative into a quantitative physical science. These new physical methods based on heat balance were quickly adopted by climatologists around the world. In 1963, Budyko directed the compilation of an atlas illustrating the components of the Earth's heat balance.

== Life ==
Ethnically Belarusian, Budyko graduated in 1942 from the Division of Physics of the Leningrad Polytechnic Institute. As a researcher at the Leningrad Geophysical Observatory, he received his doctorate in physical and mathematical sciences in 1951. Budyko served as deputy director of the Geophysical Observatory until 1954, as director until 1972, and as head of the Division for Physical Climatology at the observatory from 1972 until 1975. In that year he was appointed director of the Division for Climate Change Research at the State Hydrological Institute in Leningrad.

== Studies ==
He was the first researcher to discuss the Pleistocene megafauna extinction. Budyko published a study in 1969 outlining Arctic amplification, describing how Arctic sea ice decline affects Arctic temperatures due to the ice–albedo feedback. The study attracted significant attention since it hinted at the possibility for a runaway positive feedback within the global climate system.

In 1972, Budyko published forecasts focusing on Arctic sea ice and global mean temperature extending out 100 years. He calculated that a few tenths of one percent increase in solar radiation input could melt the icecaps. Budyko reckoned that, as early as 2050, the Arctic Ocean's ice cover could be melted away entirely. His models showed that a 50% increase in atmospheric CO_{2} would melt all the polar ice, whereas a reduction of the gas by half "could lead to a complete glaciation of the Earth." For the period 1970 to 2019, Budyko's model predicted an increase in the global mean temperature of 1 °C or 1.80 °F and the disappearance of about 50% of Arctic multiyear ice. Observations have since corroborated his figures, recording that mean global temperature increased by 0.98 °C or 1.76 °F over this period and that the extent of multiyear Arctic sea ice in September 2019 was about 46% smaller than in 1970. He predicted that Earth's mean global temperature would increase about 2.25 °C or 4.05 °F by 2070.

In 1972, Budyko calculated that a mere few tenths of one percent increase in solar radiation input could melt the ice caps. Moreover, his models similarly indicated that a 50% increase in atmospheric CO_{2} would melt all the polar ice, whereas reduction of the gas by half "can lead to a complete glaciation of the Earth." Due to the rising use of fossil fuels, at some time "comparatively soon (probably not later than a hundred years)... a substantial rise in air temperature will take place." As early as 2050, Budyko calculated, the Arctic Ocean's ice cover could be melted away entirely.

In 1987 Budyko together with Yuri Izrael published a study on anthropogenic climate change dealing with climate impact assessment, concluding that parts of the northern hemisphere would gain some benefit from climate change. However, near the end of his life in 1998 he gave a speech titled, "Global Climate Warming and its Consequence" when accepting the Blue Planet Prize 1998, and concluding, "On balance, it is very difficult to conclude with higher accuracy whether the projected global warming would be globally beneficial to human society or not."

In 1990, Budyko was co-author of section five of the IPCC First Assessment Report, writing about equilibrium climate change and its implications for the future, and was a peer reviewer for the report.

== Climate engineering ==
Budyko is believed to have been the first, in 1974, to put forth the concept of artificial solar radiation management with stratospheric sulfate aerosols if global warming ever became a pressing issue. This climate engineering proposal has been dubbed "Budyko's Blanket" in his honor.

== Bibliography ==
- Испарение в естественных условиях, Л., 1948;
- Атлас теплового баланса, Л., 1955 (ред.);
- Тепловой баланс земной поверхности, Л., 1956.
- Andronova, Natalia G., Budyko, Mikhail Ivanovich. In Encyclopedia of Global Environmental Change, edited by Ted Munn, vol. 1. New York: Wiley, 2002.
- Dr. Mikhail I. Budyko. Profiles of the 1998 Blue Planet Prize Recipients. The Asahi Glass Foundation. 2001 [cited May 23, 2002]. .
- Budyko, M.I., & Stepanova, N.A. (1958). The Heat Balance of the Earth’s Surface. Washington DC. 259 p.
- Budyko, M.I. (1980). Global Ecology. Progress Publisher Moscow.
- Budyko, M.I., Gerasimov, I.P. (1961). The Heat and Water Balance of the Earth’s Surface, the General Theory of Physical Geography and the Problem of the Transformation of Nature. Soviet Geography, 2(2), 3–12. doi: 10.1080/00385417.1961.10770737
- Budyko, M.I., Golitsyn, G.S., Izrael, Y.A. (1988). Global Climatic Catastrophes. New York: Springer-Verlag.
- Budyko, M.I. and Y.A. Izrael., eds. Anthropogenic Climatic Change. Tucson: University of Arizona Press, 1991.
- Budyko, M.I., A.B. Ronov, and A.L. Yanshin. (1987). History of the Earth's Atmosphere. New York: Springer-Verlag.
- Budyko, Mikhail I. "Global Climate Warming and its Consequence." Blue Planet Prize 1998 Commemorative Lectures. Ecology Symphony. October 30, 1998 [cited May 23, 2002].
