= Inés Camilloni =

Argentine scientist, climate change expert

Inés Ángela Camilloni
- Born: 2 March 1964 (age 62)
- Education: University of Buenos Aires
- Occupations: Scientist, Climatologist
- Employer: University of Buenos Aires
- Known for: Climate change, one of the authors of the Special Report on Global Warming of 1.5 °C, Geoengineering

Inés Angela Camilloni (March 2, 1964) is an Argentine climatologist, specializing in climate change in South America. She is a professor at the University of Buenos Aires and an independent researcher at the Center for Research on the Sea and Atmosphere. She is also the academic secretary of the Faculty of Exact and Natural Sciences of the UBA. Camilloni is a resident in the Solar Geoengineering Research Program of Harvard University and director of the Master's in Environmental Sciences at the Faculty of Exact and Natural Sciences of the UBA.

She is a science communicator of the effects of climate change. As part of her outreach activities, she participates in talks and interviews.

== Education ==
Camilloni received a BA in meteorology from the University of Buenos Aires in 1987. In 1996 she completed her doctorate at the same university, specializing in Atmospheric Sciences.

== Career ==
Camilloni's work addresses climate change in Argentina and at the regional level, evaluating climate models and developing climate scenarios. In 2008 she was one of the scientists working a scientific and technical report on the contamination produced by pulp mills by the Uruguay river, where Camilloni contributed to the chapter of air quality. In 2012 she participated in the creation of another technical report focused on climate change in the city of Buenos Aires, based on observed meteorological data and simulations of global climate change models.

One of her research works studies the hydrological impacts of the management of solar radiation in the La Plata basin.

In 2016, together with Vicente Barros, she published an outreach book titled La Argentina y el cambio climático. De la física a la política [Argentina and climate change. From physics to politics] edited by the EUDEBA publishing house.

Camilloni is one of the authors of the IPCC special report on global warming of 1.5 degrees (2018), where she was the only Argentine scientist invited. She participated in the fourth, fifth and sixth assessment reports of the IPCC.

Camilloni has also participated in talks that address gender perspectives in science, and has given interviews on the role of women in the scientific career.

== Books ==
- 2016. Barros, Vicente; Camilloni, Inés. La Argentina y el cambio climático. De la física a la política. Eudeba Editorial.
- 2010. Barros, Vicente; Nuñez, Mario; Camilloni, Inés; Solman, Silvina. Escenarios climáticos de la provincia de San Luis. Universidad La Punta Editorial.
- 2006. Camilloni, Inés; Vera, Carolina. El aire y el agua en nuestro planeta. Eudeba Editorial.

== Selected publications ==
- Inés Camilloni y Vicente Barros: Extreme discharge events in the Paraná River and their climate forcing. In: Journal of Hydrology. Band 278, Nr. 1–4, 2003, S. 94–106, doi:10.1016/S0022-1694(03)00133-1.
- Inés Camilloni y Mariana Barrucand: Temporal variability of the Buenos Aires, Argentina, urban heat island. In: Theoretical and Applied Climatology. Band 107, Nr. 1–2, 2012, S. 47–58, doi:10.1007/s00704-011-0459-z.
- Carla Gulizia e Inés Camilloni: Comparative analysis of the ability of a set of CMIP3 and CMIP5 global climate models to represent precipitation in South America. In: International Journal of Climatology.Band 35, Nr. 4, 2015, S. 583–595, doi:10.1002/joc.4005.
