= Stratospheric aerosol injection =

Type of solar radiation modification

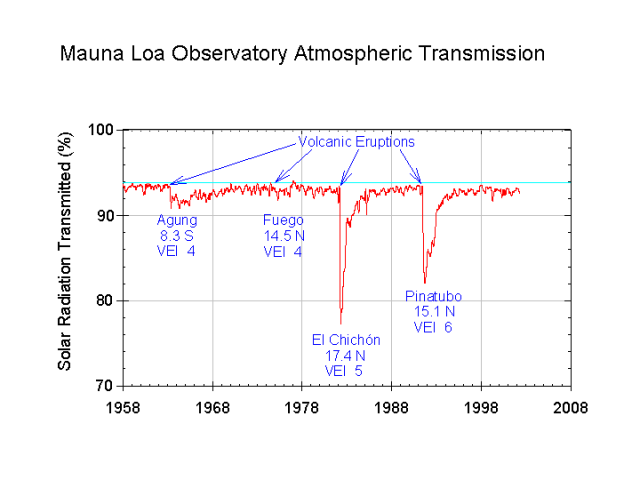
Solar radiation reduction due to volcanic eruptions, considered the best analogue for stratospheric aerosol injection.

Stratospheric aerosol injection (SAI) is a proposed method of solar geoengineering (or solar radiation modification) to reduce global warming. This would introduce aerosols into the stratosphere to create a cooling effect via global dimming and increased albedo, which occurs naturally from volcanic winter. It has been claimed that stratospheric aerosol injection, at a moderate intensity, could counter most changes to temperature and precipitation, take effect rapidly, have low direct implementation costs, and be reversible in its direct climatic effects. The Intergovernmental Panel on Climate Change concludes that it "is the most-researched solar radiation modification method, with high agreement that it could limit warming to below 1.5 °C (2.7 °F)." However, like other solar geoengineering approaches, stratospheric aerosol injection would do so imperfectly and other effects are possible, particularly if used in a suboptimal manner.

Various forms of sulfur have been shown to cool the planet after large volcanic eruptions. However, as of 2021, there has been little research and existing aerosols in the stratosphere are not well understood, so there is no leading candidate material. Alumina, calcite and salt are also under consideration. The leading proposed method of delivery is custom aircraft.

== Background and mechanism ==
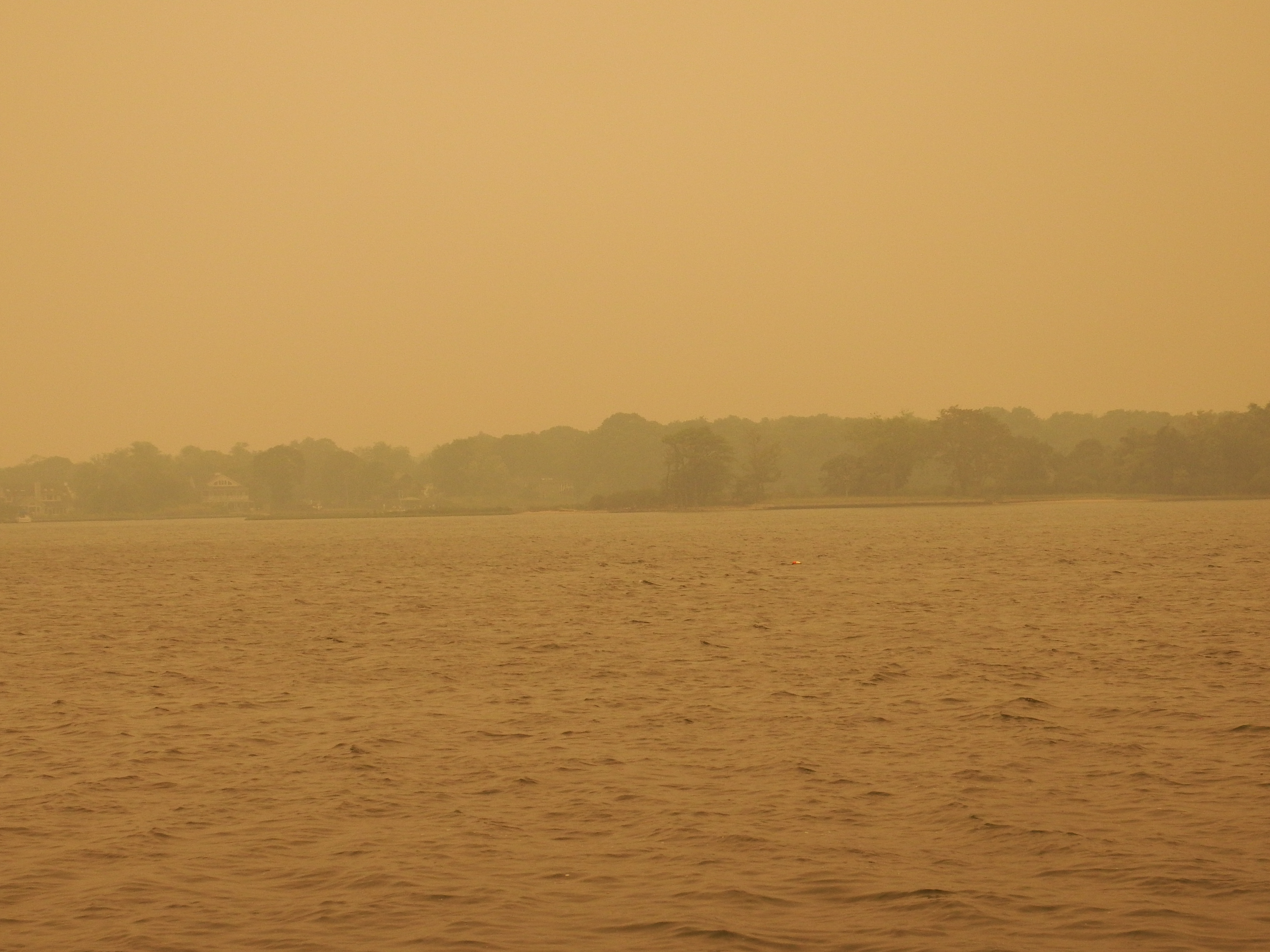
Smoke aerosol from wildfires in Quebec, Canada; eastern Long Island, NY, June 7, 2023 (local time approximately 2 pm). Nearest trees are about 500 m.

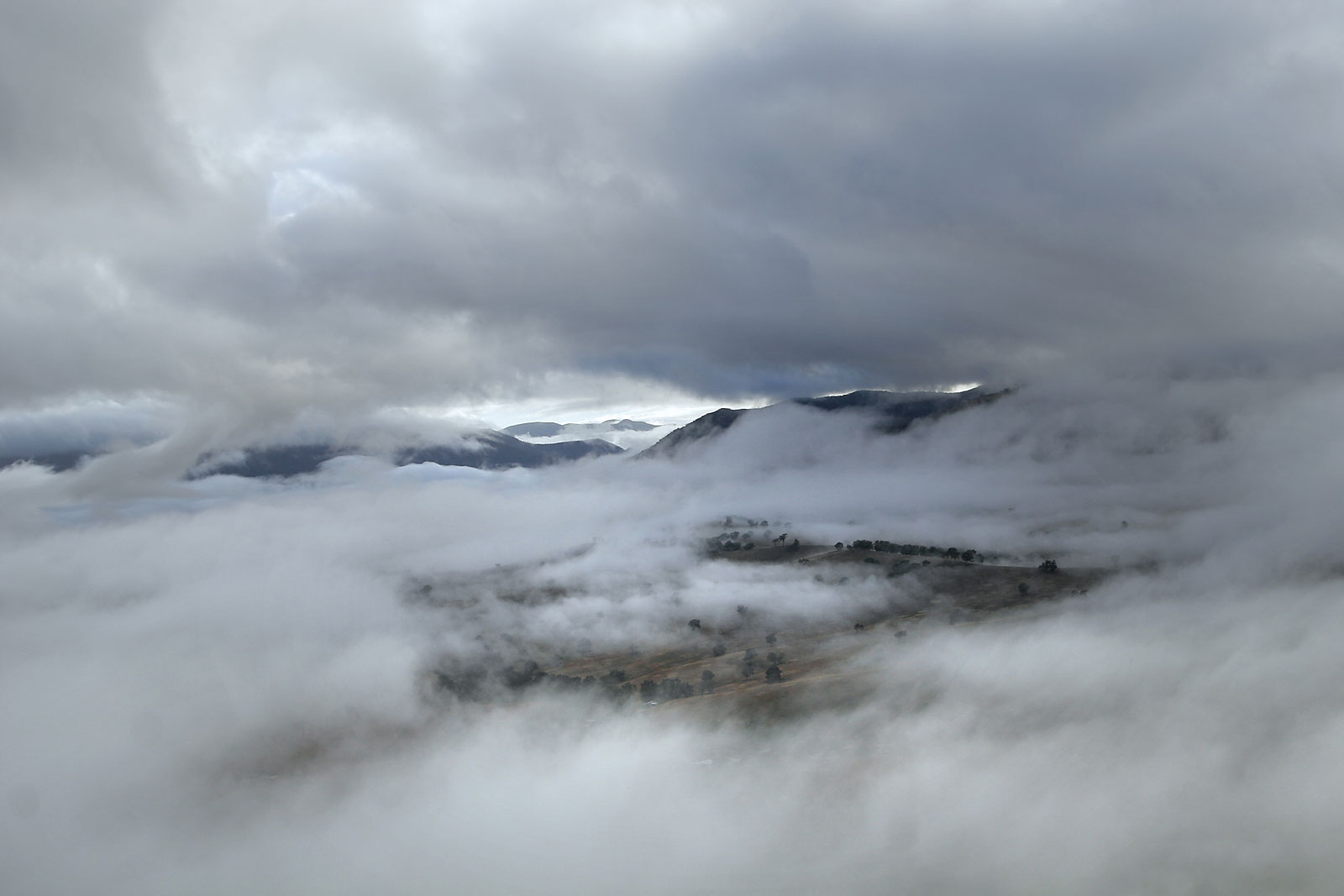
Mist and fog are aerosols

An aerosol is a suspension of fine solid particles or liquid droplets in air or another gas which broadly have falling velocities less than 0.25 m/s according to ISO 16972. Aerosols can be generated from natural or human causes. The scientific term aerosol refers to the system consisting of particles in gas, and not to the particulate matter alone. The liquid or solid particles in an aerosol have diameters typically less than 10 μm. Larger particles, with a significant settling speed, make the mixture an unstable suspension, although the distinction is somewhat arbitrary.

Prominent examples of natural aerosols are sea spray, haze from biological sources, windblown dust, smoke from natural wildfires; particles directly emitted by volcanoes or formed from volcanic emissions of gases; and fog, mist, and clouds. Other examples include pollens and fungus spores and particles ejected from coughing or sneezing.

=== Natural aerosols ===
Sources of natural aerosols include oceans, volcanoes, deserts, and living organisms. The ocean produces aerosols in two main ways. First, when wind blows over waves, it creates spray made up mostly of sea salt. Second, tiny ocean organisms—such as plankton—release dimethyl sulfide and other gases into the air which, in turn, react with other substances in the atmosphere, including water vapor, to form gaseous sulfate (sulfuric acid) aerosols. Both sea salt and sulfate aerosols help to form clouds by acting as "seeds" for water droplets, affecting cloud formation and Earth's energy balance. While these ocean aerosols are widespread, there is still uncertainty about exactly how much they affect the atmosphere.

Volcanic eruptions release ash and gases into the air. Although the ash falls out of the atmosphere relatively quickly, sulfur dioxide can rise into the stratosphere, where it reacts with water vapor to form long-lived sulfate aerosols in the upper atmosphere. These reflect sunlight and temporarily cool the planet. After a large eruption, these particles can stay in the air for a year or more.

Natural aerosols cool the Earth. When large volcanic eruptions occur, they can cause short-term global cooling of around half a degree or more, depending on the size of the eruption. For example, the eruption of Mount Pinatubo in 1991 caused global temperatures to drop by about 0.5 degrees Celsius for up to three years. These events have played an important role in past climate variability.

=== Anthropogenic aerosols ===
Human activities, especially fossil fuel combustion and biomass burning, emit aerosols directly and indirectly via gases that react in the atmosphere. Common anthropogenic aerosols include sulfates, nitrates, black carbon (soot), and organic carbon. Among these, sulfates are the dominant cooling agent. Organic carbon aerosols also reflect light, while black carbon absorbs it, warming the air and darkening snow and ice.

The net effect of anthropogenic aerosols has been to mask global warming. From 1850 to 2014, they reduced global average surface temperature by about 0.66 °C. This cooling is stronger in the more populous Northern Hemisphere. This uneven effect has altered rainfall patterns, including a weakening of tropical monsoons.

Air pollution regulations have reduced sulfate emissions in Europe and North America since the 1980s, and more recently in China. These reductions have improved air quality but diminish the cooling influence of aerosols, contributing to accelerated warming.

== History ==
Mikhail Budyko is believed to have been the first, in 1974, to put forth the concept of artificial solar radiation management with stratospheric sulfate aerosols if global warming ever became a pressing issue. Such controversial climate engineering proposals for global dimming have sometimes been called a "Budyko Blanket".

In 2009, a Russian team tested aerosol formation in the lower troposphere using helicopters. In 2015, David Keith and Gernot Wagner described a potential field experiment, the Stratospheric Controlled Perturbation Experiment (SCoPEx), using stratospheric calcium carbonate injection, but as of October 2020 the time and place had not yet been determined. SCoPEx is in part funded by Bill Gates. Sir David King, a former chief scientific adviser to the government of the United Kingdom, stated that SCoPEX and Gates' plans to dim the sun with calcium carbonate could have disastrous effects.

In 2012, the Bristol University-led Stratospheric Particle Injection for Climate Engineering (SPICE) project planned on a limited field test to evaluate a potential delivery system. The group received support from the EPSRC, NERC and STFC to the tune of £2.1 million and was one of the first UK projects aimed at providing evidence-based knowledge about solar radiation management. Although the field testing was cancelled, the project panel decided to continue the lab-based elements of the project. Furthermore, a consultation exercise was undertaken with members of the public in a parallel project by Cardiff University, with specific exploration of attitudes to the SPICE test. This research found that almost all of the participants in the poll were willing to allow the field trial to proceed, but very few were comfortable with the actual use of stratospheric aerosols. A campaign opposing geoengineering led by the ETC Group drafted an open letter calling for the project to be suspended until international agreement is reached, specifically pointing to the upcoming convention of parties to the Convention on Biological Diversity in 2012.

Stardust Solutions was established in 2023-24 as a for-profit venture capital backed SAI venture.

== Implementation and technical considerations ==
=== Materials ===
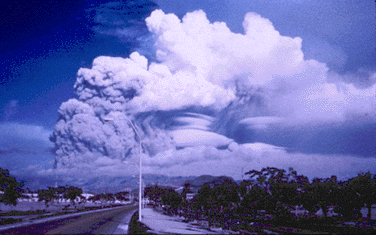
Pinatubo eruption cloud. This volcano released huge quantities of stratospheric sulfur aerosols and contributed greatly to understanding of the subject.

Various forms of sulfur were proposed as the injected substance, as this is in part how volcanic eruptions cool the planet. Precursor gases such as sulfur dioxide and hydrogen sulfide have been considered. According to estimates, "one kilogram of well placed sulfur in the stratosphere would roughly offset the warming effect of several hundred thousand kilograms of carbon dioxide." One study calculated the impact of injecting sulfate particles, or aerosols, every one to four years into the stratosphere in amounts equal to those lofted by the volcanic eruption of Mount Pinatubo in 1991. Use of gaseous sulfuric acid appears to reduce the problem of aerosol growth. Materials such as photophoretic particles, metal oxides (as in Welsbach seeding, and titanium dioxide), and diamond are also under consideration.

=== Delivery ===
Various techniques have been proposed for delivering the aerosol or precursor gases. The required altitude to enter the stratosphere is the height of the tropopause, which varies from 11 kilometres (6.8 mi/36,000 ft) at the poles to 17 kilometers (11 mi/58,000 ft) at the equator.

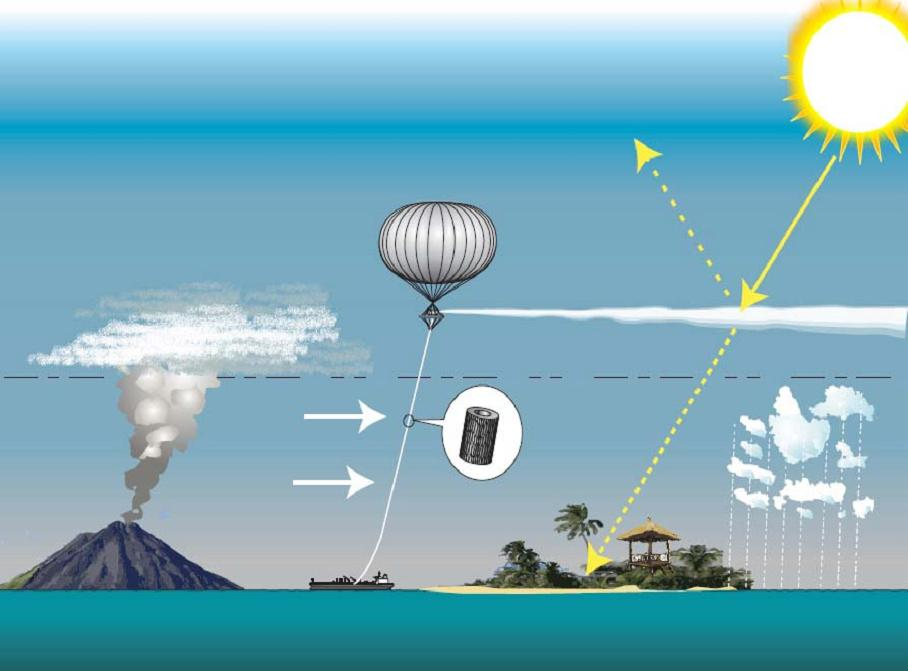
Proposed tethered balloon to inject aerosols into the stratosphere

- Civilian aircraft including the Boeing 747-400 and Gulfstream G550/650, C-37A could be modified at relatively low cost to deliver sufficient amounts of required material according to one study, but a later metastudy suggests a new aircraft would be needed but easy to develop.
- Military aircraft such as the F15-C variant of the F-15 Eagle have the necessary flight ceiling, but limited payload. Military tanker aircraft such as the KC-135 Stratotanker and KC-10 Extender also have the necessary ceiling at latitudes closer to the poles and have greater payload capacity.
- Modified artillery might have the necessary capability, but requires a polluting and expensive propellant charge to loft the payload. Railgun artillery could be a non-polluting alternative.
- High-altitude balloons can be used to lift precursor gases, in tanks, bladders or in the balloons' envelope.

=== Injection system ===
The latitude and distribution of injection locations has been discussed by various authors. While a near-equatorial injection regime will allow particles to enter the rising leg of the Brewer-Dobson circulation, several studies have concluded that a broader, and higher-latitude, injection regime will reduce injection mass flow rates and/or yield climatic benefits. Concentration of precursor injection in a single longitude appears to be beneficial, with condensation onto existing particles reduced, giving better control of the size distribution of aerosols resulting. The long residence time of carbon dioxide in the atmosphere may require a millennium-timescale commitment to aerosol injection if aggressive emissions abatement is not pursued simultaneously.

=== Welsbach seeding (metal oxide particles) ===
Welsbach seeding is a patented solar radiation modification method, involving seeding the stratosphere with small (10 to 100 micron) metal oxide particles (thorium dioxide, aluminium oxide). The purpose of the Welsbach seeding would be to "(reduce) atmospheric warming due to the greenhouse effect resulting from a greenhouse gases layer," by converting radiative energy at near-infrared wavelengths into radiation at far-infrared wavelengths, permitting some of the converted radiation to escape into space, thus cooling the atmosphere. The seeding as described would be performed by airplanes at altitudes between 7 and 13 kilometres.

The method was patented by Hughes Aircraft Company in 1991, US patent 5003186. Quote from the patent: "This invention relates to a method for the reduction of global warming resulting from the greenhouse effect, and in particular to a method which involves the seeding of the earth's stratosphere with Welsbach-like materials." This is not considered to be a viable option by current geoengineering experts.

=== Cost ===
A study in 2020 looked at the cost of SAI through to the year 2100. It found that relative to other climate interventions and solutions, SAI remains inexpensive. However, at about $18 billion per year per degree Celsius of warming avoided (in 2020 USD), a solar geoengineering program with substantial climate impact would lie well beyond the financial reach of individuals, small states, or other non-state potential rogue actors. The annual cost of delivering a sufficient amount of sulfur to counteract expected greenhouse warming is estimated at $5–10 billion US dollars.

SAI is expected to have low direct financial costs of implementation, relative to the expected costs of both unabated climate change and aggressive mitigation.

Early studies suggest that stratospheric aerosol injection might have a relatively low direct cost. One analysis estimated the annual cost of delivering 5 million tons of an albedo enhancing aerosol to an altitude of 20 to 30 km is at US$2 billion to 8 billion, an amount which they suggest would be sufficient to offset the expected warming during the next century. In comparison, the annual cost estimates for climate damage or emission mitigation range from US$200 billion to 2 trillion.

A 2016 study found the cost per 1 W/m^{2} of cooling to be between 5–50 billion USD/yr. Because larger particles are less efficient at cooling and drop out of the sky faster, the unit-cooling cost is expected to increase over time as increased dose leads to larger, but less efficient, particles by mechanism such as coalescence and Ostwald ripening. Assume RCP8.5, -5.5 W/m^{2} of cooling would be required by 2100 to maintain 2020 climate. At the dose level required to provide this cooling, the net efficiency per mass of injected aerosols would reduce to below 50% compared to low-level deployment (below 1W/m^{2}). At a total dose of -5.5 W/m^{2}, the cost would be between 55–550 billion USD/yr when efficiency reduction is also taken into account, bringing annual expenditure to levels comparable to other mitigation alternatives.

== Advantages ==
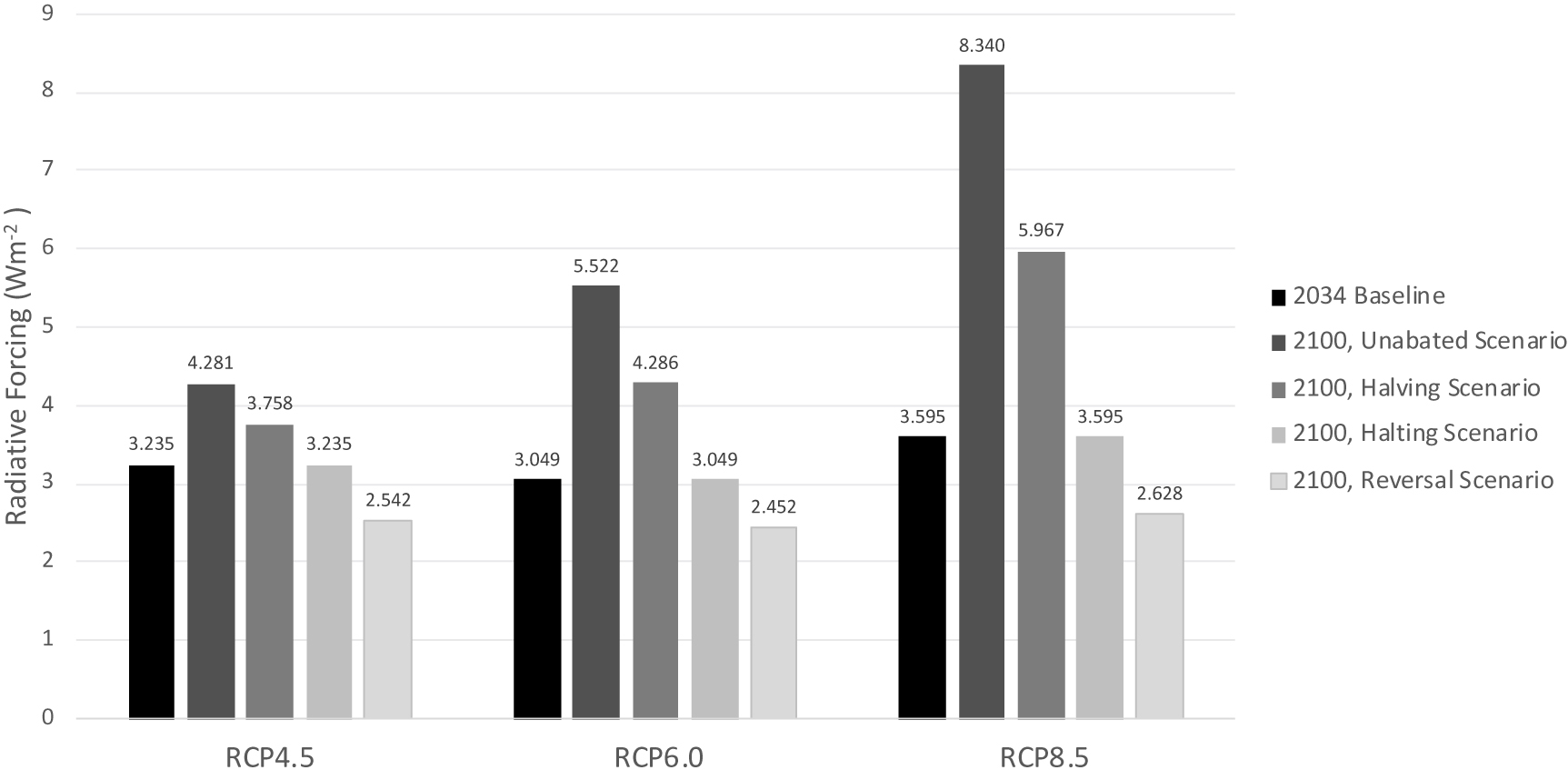
This graph shows the baseline radiative forcing under three different Representative Concentration Pathway scenarios, and how it would be affected by the deployment of SAI, starting from 2034, to halve the speed of warming by 2100, to halt the warming, or to reverse it entirely.

The advantages of this approach in comparison to other solar geoengineering methods include:

- Mimics a natural process: Stratospheric sulfur aerosols are created by existing natural processes (especially volcanoes), whose impacts have been studied via observations. This contrasts with other, more speculative solar geoengineering techniques which do not have natural analogs (e.g., space sunshade).
- Technological feasibility: In contrast to other proposed solar geoengineering techniques, such as marine cloud brightening, much of the required technology is pre-existing: chemical manufacturing, artillery shells, high-altitude aircraft, weather balloons, etc. Unsolved technical challenges include methods to deliver the material in controlled diameter with good scattering properties.
- Scalability: Some solar geoengineering techniques, such as cool roofs and ice protection, can only provide a limited intervention in the climate due to insufficient scale—one cannot reduce the temperature by more than a certain amount with each technique. Research has suggested that this technique may have a high radiative 'forcing potential'., yet can be finely tuned according to how much cooling is needed.
- Speed: A common argument is that stratospheric aerosol injection can take place quickly, and would be able to buy time for carbon sequestration projects such as carbon dioxide air capture to be implemented and start acting over decades and centuries.

== Uncertainties ==
It is uncertain how effective any solar geoengineering technique would be, due to the difficulties modeling their impacts and the complex nature of the global climate system. Certain efficacy issues are specific to stratospheric aerosols.

- Lifespan of aerosols: Tropospheric sulfur aerosols are short lived. Particles delivered into the lower stratosphere in the Arctic will typically remain aloft only for a few weeks or months, as air in this region is predominantly descending. To ensure endurance, higher-altitude delivery is needed; particles injected into the rising leg of the Brewer-Dobson circulation above the tropical tropopause typically remain aloft for several years. Sizing of particles is also crucial to their endurance.
- Aerosol delivery: There are two proposals for how to create a stratospheric sulfate aerosol cloud, either through the release of a precursor gas (SO_{2}) or the direct release of sulfuric acid (H_{2}SO_{4}) and these face different challenges. If SO_{2} gas is released it will oxidize to form H_{2}SO_{4} and then condense to form droplets far from the injection site. Releasing SO_{2} would not allow control over the size of the particles that are formed but would not require a sophisticated release mechanism. Simulations suggest that as the SO_{2} release rate is increased there would be diminishing returns on the cooling effect, as larger particles would be formed which have a shorter lifetime and are less effective scatterers of light. If H_{2}SO_{4} is released directly then the aerosol particles would form very quickly and in principle the particle size could be controlled although the engineering requirements for this are uncertain. Assuming a technology for direct H_{2}SO_{4} release could be conceived and developed, it would allow control over the particle size to possibly alleviate some of the inefficiencies associated with SO_{2} release.
- Strength of cooling: The magnitude of the effect of forcing from aerosols by decreasing insolation received at the surface is not completely certain, as its scientific modelling involves complex calculations due to different confounding factors and parameters such as optical properties, spatial and temporal distribution of emission or injection, albedo, geography, loading, rate of transport of sulfate, global burden, atmospheric chemistry, mixing and reactions with other compounds and aerosols, particle size, relative humidity, and clouds. Along with others, aerosol size distribution and hygroscopicity have particularly high uncertainty due to being closely related to sulfate aerosol interactions with other aerosols which affects the amount of radiation reflected. As of 2021, state-of-the-art CMIP6 models estimate that total cooling from the currently present aerosols is between 0.1 °C (0.18 °F) to 0.7 °C (1.3 °F); the IPCC Sixth Assessment Report uses the best estimate of 0.5 °C (0.90 °F), but there's still a lot of contradictory research on the impacts of aerosols of clouds which can alter this estimate of aerosol cooling, and consequently, our knowledge of how many millions of tons must be deployed annually to achieve the desired effect.

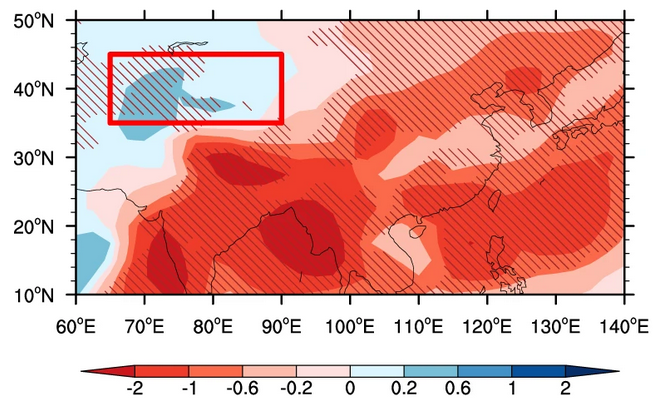
Anthropogenic sulfate aerosols have decreased precipitation over most of Asia (red), but increased it over some parts of Central Asia (blue).

- Hydrological cycle: Since the historical global dimming from tropospheric sulfate pollution is already well-known to have reduced rainfall in certain areas, and is likely to have weakened Monsoon of South Asia and contributed to or even outright caused the 1984 Ethiopian famine, the impact on the hydrological cycle and patterns is one of the most-discussed uncertainties of the different stratospheric aerosol injection proposals. It has been suggested that while changes in precipitation from stratospheric aerosol injection are likely to be more manageable than the changes expected under future warming, one of the main impacts it would have on mortality is by shifting the habitat of mosquitoes and thus substantially affecting the distribution and spread of vector-borne diseases. Considering the already-extensive present-day mosquito habitat, it is currently unclear whether those changes are likely to be positive or negative.

== Risks ==
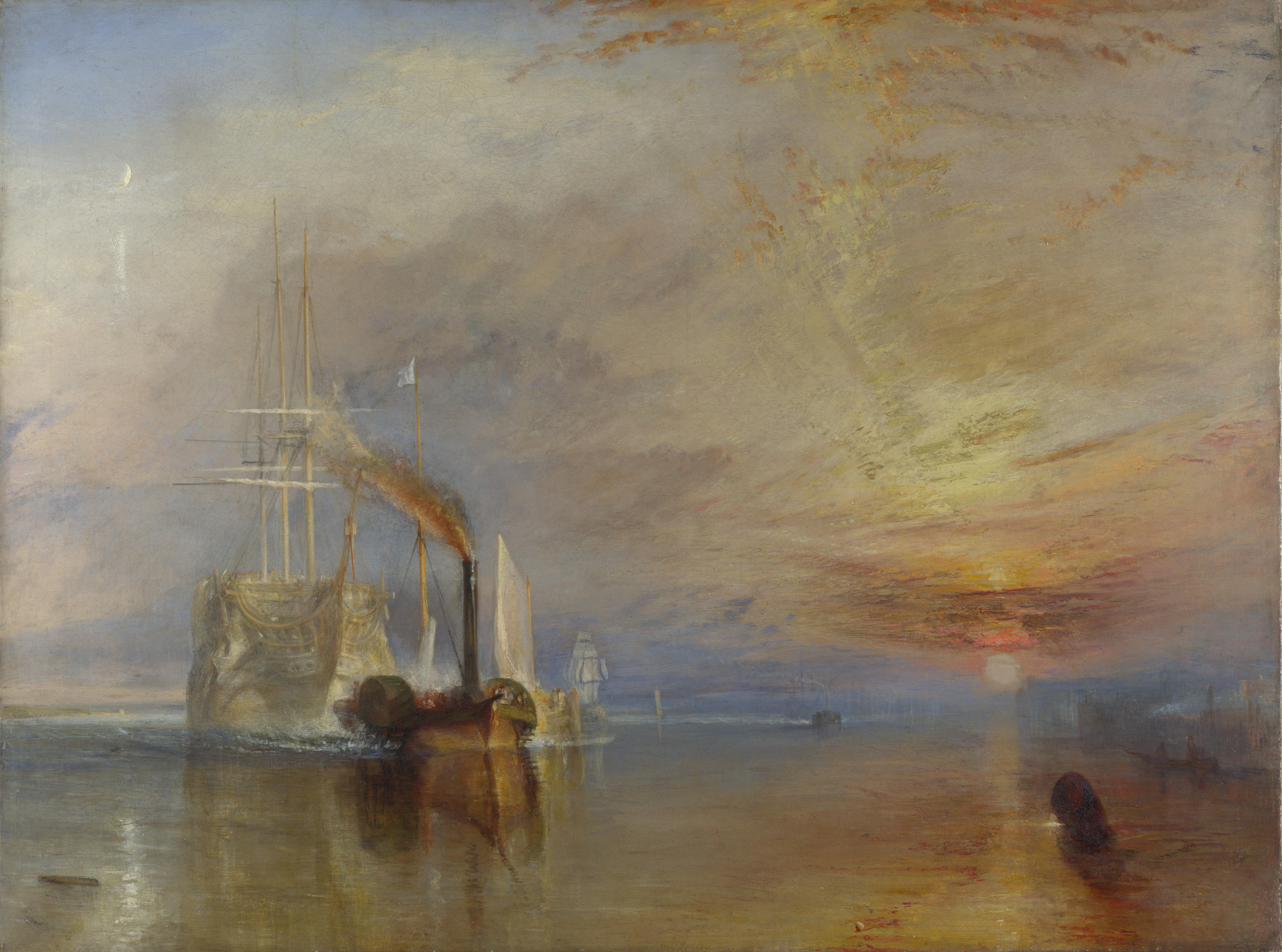
Turner was inspired by dramatic sunsets caused by volcanic aerosols

Solar geoengineering in general poses various problems and risks. However, certain problems are specific to or more pronounced with stratospheric sulfide injection.

- Ozone depletion: a potential side effect of sulfur aerosols; and these concerns have been supported by modelling. However, this may only occur if high enough quantities of aerosols drift to, or are deposited in, polar stratospheric clouds before the levels of CFCs and other ozone destroying gases fall naturally to safe levels because stratospheric aerosols, together with the ozone destroying gases, are responsible for ozone depletion. The injection of other aerosols that may be safer such as calcite has therefore been proposed. The injection of non-sulfide aerosols like calcite (limestone) would also have a cooling effect while counteracting ozone depletion and would be expected to reduce other side effects.
- Whitening of the sky: Volcanic eruptions are known to affect the appearance of sunsets significantly, and a change in sky appearance after the eruption of Mount Tambora in 1816 "The Year Without A Summer" was the inspiration for the paintings of J. M. W. Turner. Since stratospheric aerosol injection would involve smaller quantities of aerosols, it is expected to cause a subtler change to sunsets and a slight hazing of blue skies. How stratospheric aerosol injection may affect clouds remains uncertain.
- Stratospheric temperature change: Aerosols can also absorb some radiation from the Sun, the Earth, and the surrounding atmosphere. This changes the surrounding air temperature and could potentially impact the stratospheric circulation, which in turn may impact the surface circulation.
- Deposition and acid rain: The surface deposition of sulfate injected into the stratosphere may also have an impact on ecosystems. However, the amount and wide dispersal of injected aerosols means that their impact on particulate concentrations and acidity of precipitation would be very small.
- Ecological consequences: The consequences of stratospheric aerosol injection on ecological systems are unknown and potentially vary by ecosystem with differing impacts on marine versus terrestrial biomes.
- Mixed effects on agriculture: A historical study in 2018 found that stratospheric sulfate aerosols injected by the volcanic eruptions of Chicón (1982) and Mount Pinatubo (1991) had mixed effects on global crop yields of certain major crops. Based on several studies, the IPCC Sixth Assessment Report suggests that crop yields and carbon sinks would be largely unaffected or may even increase slightly, because reduced photosynthesis due to lower sunlight would be offset by CO2 fertilization effect and the reduction in thermal stress, but there's less confidence about how the specific ecosystems may be affected.
- Inhibition of Solar Energy Technologies: Uniformly reduced net shortwave radiation would hurt solar photovoltaics by the same 2–5% as for plants. The increased scattering of collimated incoming sunlight would more drastically reduce the efficiencies (by 11% for RCP8.5) of concentrating solar thermal power for both electricity production and chemical reactions, such as solar cement production.

== Governance ==
Most of the existing governance of stratospheric sulfate aerosols is from that which is applicable to solar radiation management more broadly. However, some existing legal instruments would be relevant to stratospheric sulfate aerosols specifically. At the international level, the Convention on Long-Range Transboundary Air Pollution (CLRTAP Convention) obligates those countries which have ratified it to reduce their emissions of particular transboundary air pollutants. Notably, both solar radiation management and climate change (as well as greenhouse gases) could satisfy the definition of "air pollution" which the signatories commit to reduce, depending on their actual negative effects. Commitments to specific values of the pollutants, including sulfates, are made through protocols to the CLRTAP Convention. Full implementation or large scale climate response field tests of stratospheric sulfate aerosols could cause countries to exceed their limits. However, because stratospheric injections would be spread across the globe instead of concentrated in a few nearby countries, and could lead to net reductions in the "air pollution" which the CLRTAP Convention is to reduce so they may be allowed.

The stratospheric injection of sulfate aerosols would cause the Vienna Convention for the Protection of the Ozone Layer to be applicable due to their possible deleterious effects on stratospheric ozone. That treaty generally obligates its Parties to enact policies to control activities which "have or are likely to have adverse effects resulting from modification or likely modification of the ozone layer." The Montreal Protocol to the Vienna Convention prohibits the production of certain ozone depleting substances, via phase outs. Sulfates are presently not among the prohibited substances.

In the United States, the Clean Air Act might give the United States Environmental Protection Agency authority to regulate stratospheric sulfate aerosols.

== See also ==
- Cloud seeding – Weather modification that condenses clouds to cause rainfall
