= Geoengineering =

Deliberate and large-scale intervention in Earth's climate system

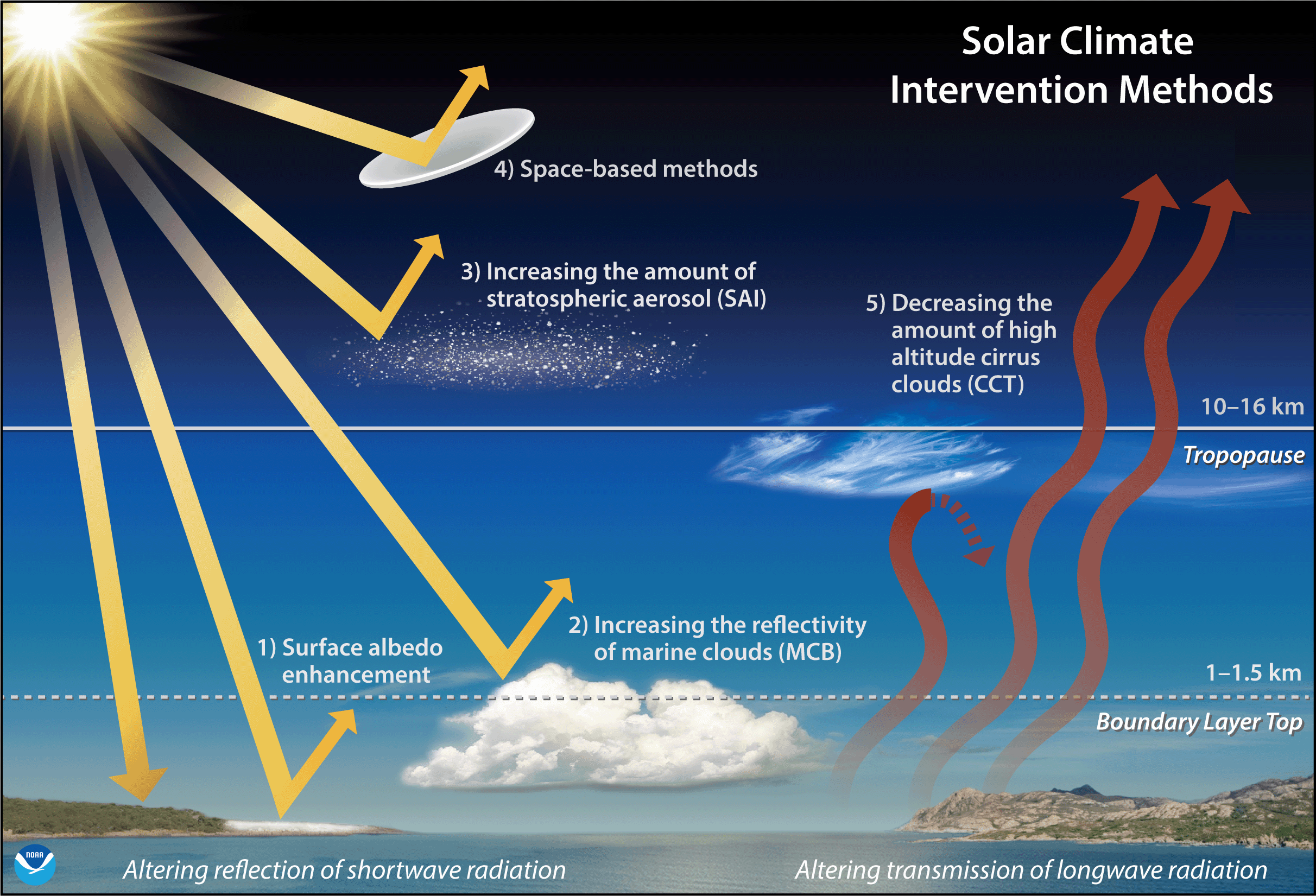
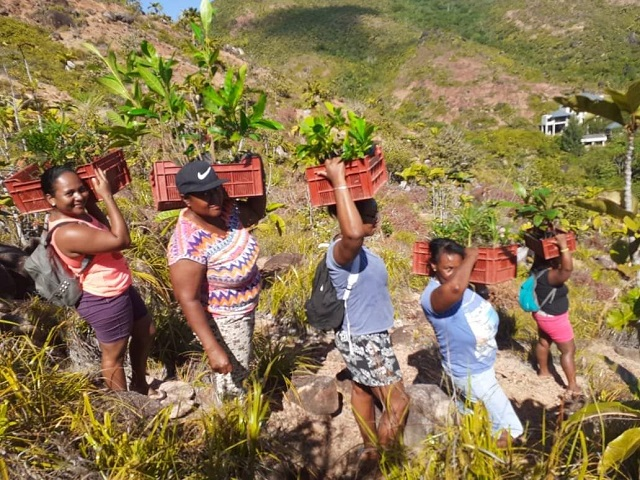
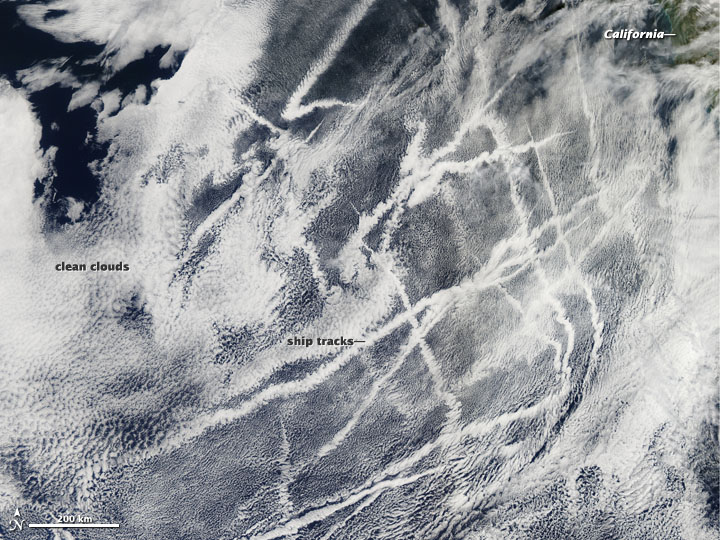
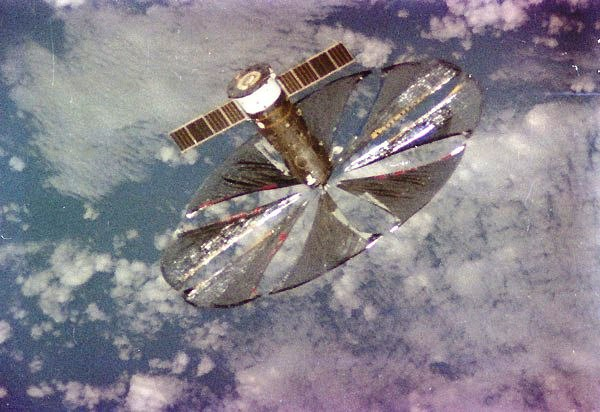
Examples of geoengineering methods: Solar radiation modification technologies, reforestation in the Seychelles, (marine cloud brightening), experimental space mirror.

Geoengineering (also known as climate engineering or climate intervention) is the deliberate large-scale interventions in the Earth’s climate system intended to counteract human-caused climate change. The term commonly encompasses two broad categories: large-scale carbon dioxide removal (CDR) and solar radiation modification (SRM). CDR involves techniques to remove carbon dioxide from the atmosphere and is generally considered a form of climate change mitigation. SRM aims to reduce global warming by reflecting a small portion of sunlight (solar radiation) away from Earth and back into space. Although historically grouped together, these approaches differ substantially in mechanisms, timelines, and risk profiles, and are now typically discussed separately. Some other large-scale engineering proposals—such as interventions to slow the melting of polar and alpine ice—are also sometimes classified as forms of geoengineering.

Some types of geoengineering present political, social and ethical issues. One common objection is that focusing on these technologies could undermine efforts to reduce greenhouse gas emissions. Effective governance and international oversight are widely regarded as essential.

Major scientific organizations have examined the potential, risks, and governance needs of geoengineering, including the US National Academies of Sciences, Engineering, and Medicine, the Royal Society, the UN Educational, Scientific and Cultural Organization (UNESCO), and the World Climate Research Programme.

== Methods ==
=== Carbon dioxide removal ===
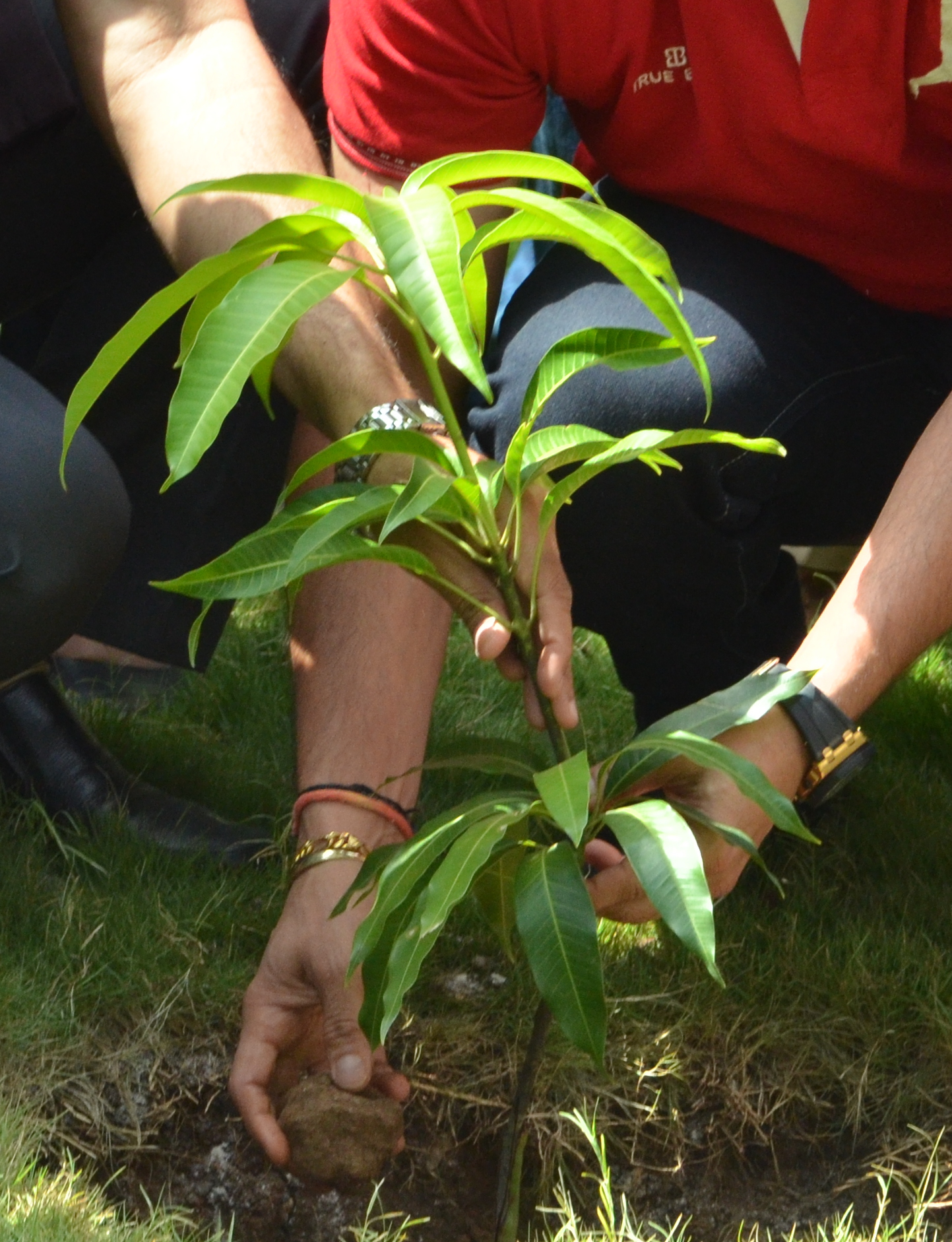
Planting trees is a nature-based way to remove carbon dioxide from the atmosphere; however, the effect may only be temporary in some cases.

Carbon dioxide removal (CDR) is a process in which carbon dioxide (CO_{2}) is removed from Earth's atmosphere by deliberate human activities and durably stored in geological, terrestrial, or marine reservoirs, or in products. This process is also known as carbon removal, greenhouse gas removal or negative emissions. CDR is more and more often integrated into climate policy, as an element of climate change mitigation strategies. Achieving net zero emissions will require first and foremost deep and sustained cuts in emissions, and then—in addition—the use of CDR ("CDR is what puts the net into net zero emissions" ). In the future, CDR may be able to counterbalance emissions that are technically difficult to eliminate, such as some agricultural and industrial emissions.

CDR includes methods that are implemented on land or in aquatic systems. Land-based methods include afforestation, reforestation, agricultural practices that sequester carbon in soils (carbon farming), bioenergy with carbon capture and storage (BECCS), and direct air capture combined with storage. There are also CDR methods that use oceans and other water bodies. Those are called ocean fertilization, ocean alkalinity enhancement, wetland restoration and blue carbon approaches. A detailed analysis needs to be performed to assess how much negative emissions a particular process achieves. This analysis includes life cycle analysis and "monitoring, reporting, and verification" (MRV) of the entire process. Carbon capture and storage (CCS) are not regarded as CDR because CCS does not reduce the amount of carbon dioxide already in the atmosphere.

=== Solar radiation modification ===
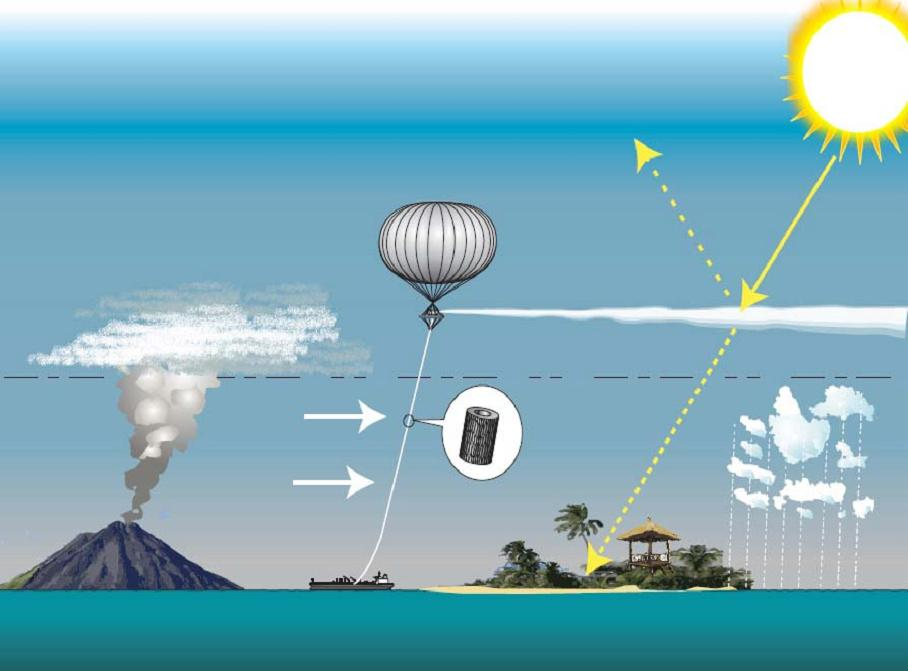
Proposed solar radiation modification using a tethered balloon to inject sulfate aerosols into the stratosphere

Solar radiation modification (SRM), also called solar geoengineering, is a group of large-scale approaches to reduce global warming by increasing the amount of sunlight that is reflected away from Earth and back to outer space. It is not intended to replace efforts to reduce greenhouse gas emissions, but rather to complement them as a potential way to limit global warming. SRM is a form of geoengineering.

The most-researched SRM method is stratospheric aerosol injection (SAI), in which small reflective particles would be introduced into the upper atmosphere to reflect sunlight. Other approaches include marine cloud brightening (MCB), which would increase the reflectivity of clouds over the oceans, or constructing a space sunshade or a space mirror, to reduce the amount of sunlight reaching earth.

=== Glacial geoengineering ===
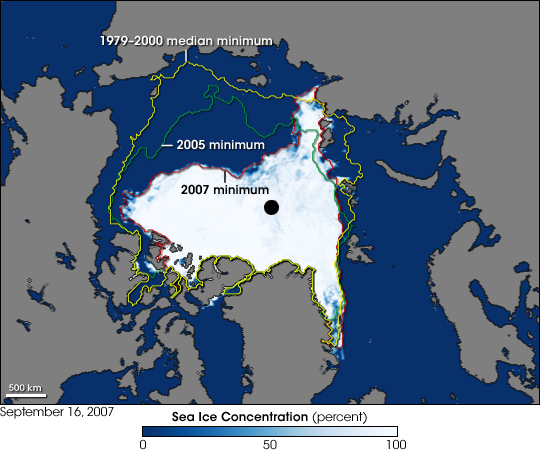
Arctic sea ice coverage as of 2007 compared to 2005 and also compared to 1979-2000 average

Glacial geoengineering is a set of proposed geoengineering approaches that focus on slowing the loss of glaciers, ice sheets, and sea ice in polar regions and, in some cases, alpine areas. Proposals are motivated by concerns that feedback loops—such as ice-albedo loss, accelerated glacier flow, and permafrost methane release—could amplify climate change and trigger climate tipping points.

Proposed glacial geoengineering methods include regional or local solar radiation management, thinning cirrus clouds to allow more heat to escape, and deploying mechanical or engineering structures to stabilize ice. Specific strategies under investigation are stratospheric aerosol injection focused on polar regions, marine cloud brightening, surface albedo modification with reflective materials, basal interventions such as draining subglacial water or promoting basal freezing, and ice shelf protection measures including seabed curtains.

Glacial geoengineering is in the early research stage and many proposals face major technical, environmental, and governance challenges. Supporters argue that targeted interventions could help stabilize ice sheets, slow sea-level rise, and reduce the risk of passing irreversible thresholds in the climate system. At the same time, experts caution that the effectiveness of these methods remains highly uncertain and that interventions could produce unintended side effects. Glacial geoengineering is generally considered a possible complement to, not a replacement for, efforts to reduce greenhouse gas emissions.

== Governance ==
Most governance issues relating to geoengineering are specific to the category or the specific method. Nevertheless, a couple of international governance instruments have addressed geoengineering collectively.

The Conference of Parties to the Convention on Biological Diversity have made several decisions regarding "climate related geoengineering." That of 2010 established "a comprehensive non-binding normative framework" for "climate-related geoengineering activities that may affect biodiversity," requesting that such activities be justified by the need to gather specific scientific data, undergo prior environmental assessment, be subject to effective regulatory oversight. The Parties' 2016 decision called for "more transdisciplinary research and sharing of knowledge... in order to better understand the impacts of climate-related geoengineering."

The parties to the London Convention on the Prevention of Marine Pollution by Dumping of Wastes and Other Matter and its associated London Protocol have addressed "marine geoengineering." In 2013, the parties to the London Protocol adopted an amendment to establish a legally binding framework for regulating marine geoengineering, initially limited to ocean fertilization and requiring assessment and permitting before any activity proceeds. This amendment has not yet entered into force due to insufficient ratifications. In 2022, the parties to both agreements acknowledged growing interest in marine geoengineering, identified four techniques for priority review, and encouraged careful assessment of proposed projects under existing guidelines while considering options for further regulation. In 2023, they cautioned that these techniques could pose serious environmental risks, highlighted scientific uncertainty about their effects, urged strict application of assessment frameworks, and called for broader international cooperation. Their work is supported by the Joint Group of Experts on the Scientific Aspects of Marine Environmental Protection of the International Maritime Organization.
