= Index of climate change articles =

This is a list of climate change topics.

== 0-9 ==
100% renewable energy - 100,000-year problem - 1500-Year climate cycle - 4 Degrees and Beyond International Climate Conference

== A ==
Abrupt climate change - The Age of Stupid - Albedo - An Inconvenient Truth - An Inconvenient Book - Antarctica cooling controversy - Antarctic Bottom Water - Antarctic Cold Reversal - Antarctic oscillation - Anthropocene extinction - Arctic amplification - Arctic Climate Impact Assessment - Arctic geoengineering - Arctic shrinkage - Arctic oscillation - North Atlantic Oscillation - Arctic Climate Impact Assessment - Arctic methane release - Arctic sea ice decline - Arctic shrinkage - Argo (oceanography) - ARkStorm - Athabasca oil sands - Atlantic Multidecadal Oscillation - Atmospheric circulation - Atmospheric sciences - Infrared window - Attribution of recent climate change - Aviation and climate change - Aviation and the environment - Avoiding dangerous climate change

== B ==
Bali Communiqué - Bali Road Map - Bezos Earth Fund - Biochar - Bioenergy with carbon capture and storage - Bio-geoengineering - Black carbon - Blytt–Sernander system - Broad spectrum revolution - Business action on climate change

== C ==
Callendar effect - Cap and Share - Carbon bubble - Carbon capture and storage - Carbon cycle - Carbon negative - Carbon neutral - Carbon price - Carbon project - Carbon sequestration - Carbon offset - Carbon sink - Carbon tax - Catastrophic climate change - Center for the Study of Carbon Dioxide and Global Change - Clathrate gun hypothesis - Clean coal technology - Clean Energy Trends - Climate - Climate change - Climate change acronyms - Climate Change Act 2008 - Climate change denial - Climate change feedback - Climate change in Japan - Climate change in popular culture - Climate change mitigation - Climate change mitigation - Climate change mitigation scenarios - Climate Code Red (book) - Climate commitment - Climate communication - Climate crisis - Climate crunch - Climate cycle - Climate emergency declaration - Climate engineering - Climate ethics - Climate governance - Climate Investment Funds - Climate model - Climate refugee - Climate risk management - List of climate scientists - Climate sensitivity - Climate spiral - Climate stabilization wedge - Climate surprise - Climate system - Climate variability - Climate Vulnerable Forum - Climatic Research Unit email controversy - Cloud feedback - Cloud reflectivity enhancement - Coal phase out - Contraction and Convergence - Contrail - Cool roof - Cool tropics paradox - Coral bleaching

== D ==
The Day After Tomorrow - Dendroclimatology - Divergence problem - Drought - Drought in the United States

== E ==
Early anthropocene - Earth Hour - Earth's atmosphere - Earth's energy budget - Earthshine - East Antarctic Ice Sheet - Eco-efficiency - Ecological Forecasting - Ecotax - Effects of climate change on agriculture - Effect of climate change on plant biodiversity - Effects of climate change on marine mammals - Effects of climate change on oceans - Effects of climate change - Effects of climate change on Australia - Effects of global warming on India - Efficient energy use - El Niño–Southern Oscillation (ENSO) - Emission inventory - Emission Reduction Unit - Emission standards - Emissions trading - Energie-Cités - Energy Autonomy - Energy conservation - Energy forestry - Energy poverty - Enteric fermentation - Environmental crime - Environmental impact of aviation - Environmental skepticism - European Climate Forum - Externality - Extreme event attribution

== F ==
Fossil fuel - Fossil fuel divestment - Fossil fuel phase out - Fossil fuel power plant - Freon - Food security

== G ==
G8+5 - Climate engineering - GFDL CM2.X - Glacial period - Global Change Master Directory - General circulation model - Global cooling - Global dimming - Global warming - Global warming controversy - Global warming hiatus - Global warming period - Global warming potential - Greenhouse and icehouse Earth - Greenhouse gas emissions from agriculture - Greenhouse debt - Greenhouse effect - Greenhouse gas - Greenhouse gas accounting - Greenhouse gas inventory - Gulf Stream

== H ==
Heiligendamm Process - Hell and High Water - History of climate change science - Hockey stick graph (global temperature) - Holocene - Holocene Climatic Optimum - Holocene extinction - Homogenization (climate) - How Global Warming Works - Hydraulic fracturing - Hydrological geoengineering - Hypermobile travellers

== I ==
Ice age - Ice core - Ice sheet dynamics - Individual and political action on climate change - Insolation - Instrumental temperature record - Interdecadal Pacific Oscillation - Intergovernmental Panel on Climate Change - International Conference on Climate Change - IPCC list of greenhouse gases

== K ==
Keeling Curve - Kyoto Protocol

== L ==
Laudato si' - List of climate scientists - List of geoengineering topics - List of ministers of climate change - List of proposed geoengineering projects - Little Ice Age - Long-term effects of global warming

== M ==
Magnetosphere - Maunder Minimum - Mauna Loa - Media coverage of climate change- Medieval Warm Period - Meridional overturning circulation - Meteorology - Methane - Methane clathrate - Milankovitch cycles - Molecular-scale temperature

== N ==
Nitrous oxide (N_{2}O) - North Atlantic Deep Water - North Atlantic oscillation - Northwest Passage

== O ==
Ocean acidification - Ocean anoxia - Older Dryas - Oldest Dryas - Human overpopulation - Ozone depletion

== P ==
Pacific decadal oscillation - Paleocene–Eocene Thermal Maximum - Paleoclimate Modelling Intercomparison Project - Paleothermometer - Parametrization (atmospheric modeling) - Planetary engineering - Peak oil - Phenology - Physical impacts of climate change - Polar amplification - Proxy (climate) - Paris Agreement

== Q ==
Quaternary glaciation - Quasi-biennial oscillation

== R ==
Radiative forcing - Renewable energy - Renewable energy commercialization - Retreat of glaciers since 1850 - Runaway climate change

== S ==
Sahara pump theory - Satellite temperature measurements - Scientific opinion on climate change - Scientific consensus - Scientific skepticism - Sea level rise - Shutdown of thermohaline circulation - Sixth extinction - Slash and burn - Snowball Earth - Solar Radiation Management - Solar shade - Solar variation - Space sunshade - Stratospheric Particle Injection for Climate Engineering - Stratospheric sulfur aerosols - Stratospheric sulfur aerosols (geoengineering) - Sunspot - Surveys of scientists' views on climate change - Sustainable energy

== T ==
Table of Historic and Prehistoric Climate Indicators - Temperature record of the past 1000 years - Temperature record since 1880 - Thermohaline circulation - Timeline of glaciation - TEX-86 - Thermocline - The Deniers - The Great Global Warming Swindle - The Republican War on Science - Timeline of environmental history - Tipping point (climatology)

== U ==
Urban heat island - UN climate change conference 2009 - The Uninhabitable Earth

== W ==
Warming stripes - Waste heat - Water World - West Antarctic Ice Sheet - World climate research programme - World Climate Report

== Y ==
Yamal Peninsula

== See also ==
- Glossary of climate change
- Scientific opinion on climate change
- List of countries by greenhouse gas emissions per capita
- List of countries by carbon dioxide emissions per capita
- List of countries by carbon dioxide emissions
- Category:Climate change
- Category:Climate change by country
- Category:Climatology
