= Law of Connecticut =

The law of Connecticut is the system of law and legal precedent of the U.S. state of Connecticut. Sources of law include the Constitution of Connecticut and the Connecticut General Statutes.

== Legal history ==
=== Fundamental Orders of Connecticut ===
The Fundamental Orders were adopted by the Connecticut Colony council on January 14, 1639 OS (January 24, 1639 NS). The fundamental orders describe the government set up by the Connecticut River towns, setting its structure and powers. They wanted the government to have access to the open ocean for trading.

The Orders have the features of a written constitution and are considered by some as the first written Constitution in the Western tradition. Thus, Connecticut earned its nickname of The Constitution State. Connecticut historian John Fiske was the first to claim that the Fundamental Orders were the first written Constitution, a claim disputed by some modern historians. The orders were transcribed into the official colony records by the colony's secretary Thomas Welles. It was a Constitution the government that Massachusetts had set up. However, this Order gave men more voting rights and made more men eligible to run for elected positions.

=== Colonial law ===
Originally, the first revision of the early laws and orders of Connecticut (the Code of 1650) was not printed. Prior to the revision of 1672, which was printed in 1675, the laws and orders of the General Court were promulgated only by manuscript copies. They were recorded in the public records of the court, and also in the town records, and it was made the duty of the constables of the several towns to publish such laws as should be made from time to time, and annually, to read the capital news at some public meeting. The laws were few and simple, yet they were such as the exigencies of the commonwealth required, and such as may be supposed to exist in the infancy of civil governments. The Connecticut Supreme Court struck down the "Blue Laws" in 1979 as an unconstitutional breach of the due process and equal protection clauses of the United States Constitution.

=== Since 1818 ===
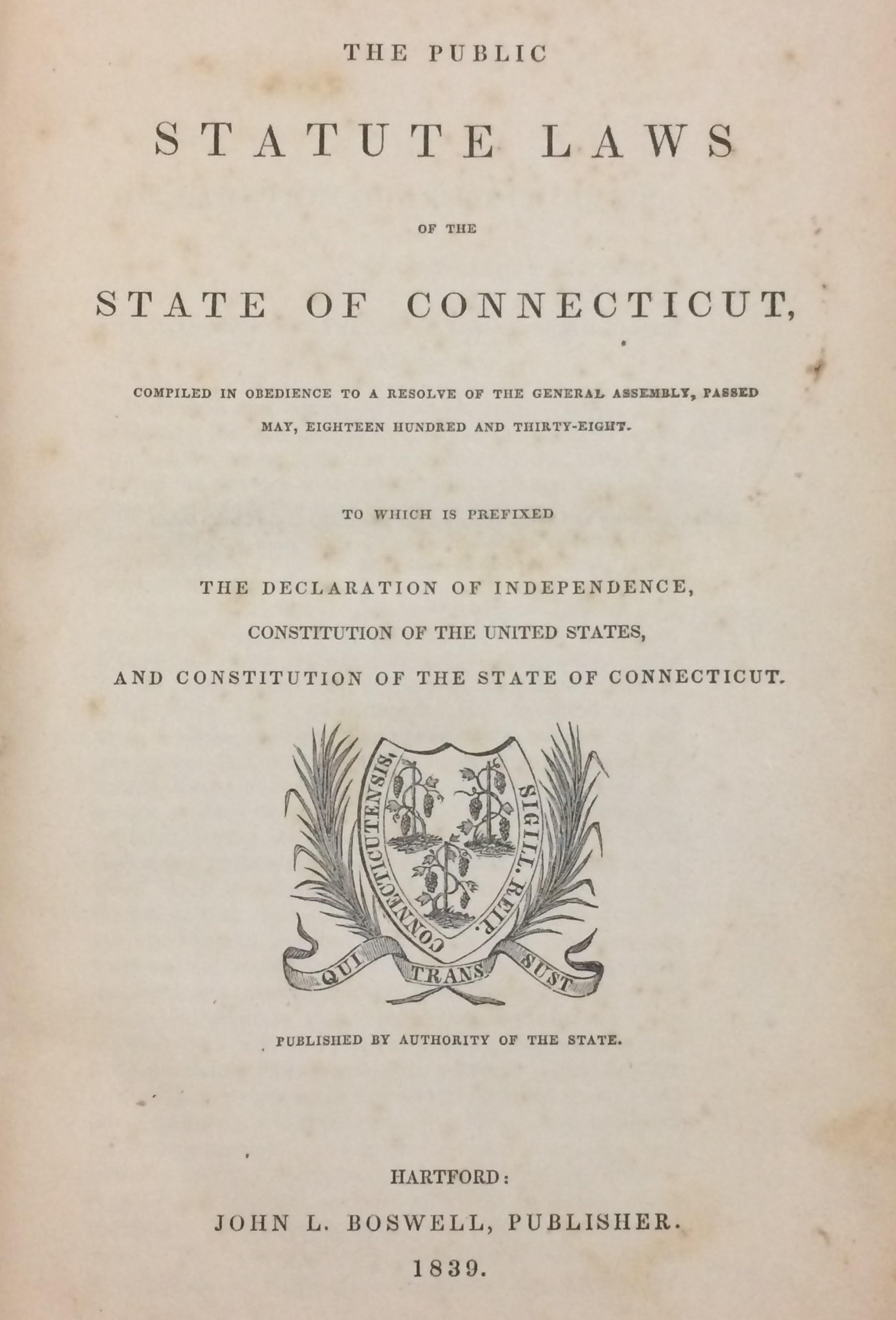
Title folio from the Connecticut General Statutes, Revision of 1838 (published 1839).

Since the famous constitution of 1818 was adopted, revisions to the Connecticut General Statutes have occurred at intervals of a few years; although the first, that of 1821, was in force for a quarter of a century. In 1835, references to judicial decisions were printed for the first time; and some years afterwards, the Secretary began to publish separately the Private Acts, which in 1870 had accumulated to six volumes.

The districts were rearranged in 1842; and in 1847, a commission consisting of Governor Dutton, Judge Waldo, and Francis Fellowes, was appointed to make a new revision, known as that of 1849; Dutton and Waldo, with David B. Booth, served again in the same way in 1864. This revision was known as that of 1865.

Before many years had passed, the need of another revision was felt, and another commission was appointed to make a new revision, with the view to classifying, consolidating, and supplying omissions and giving notes and references according to its judgment. Many ancient titles which had become obsolete, as Concerning Slavery Taverners, and the like, were left out; many penalties and fines were changed because inadequate or expressed in antiquated terms; and by careful condensation, the whole mass of statues was abridged to a volume little larger than the previous one. This was the revision of 1875.

== Sources of law ==
=== Constitution ===
The Constitution of the State of Connecticut is the basic governing document of the U.S. state of Connecticut. It was approved by referendum on December 14, 1965, and proclaimed by the governor as adopted on December 30. It comprises 14 articles and has been amended 31 times.

This constitution replaced the earlier constitution of 1818. It is the state's second constitution since the establishment of the United States. An earlier constitution dating from colonial times, the Fundamental Orders of Connecticut, remained the basis of government even as Connecticut gained its independence from Great Britain, existed as an independent polity, and joined the United States.

=== General Statutes ===
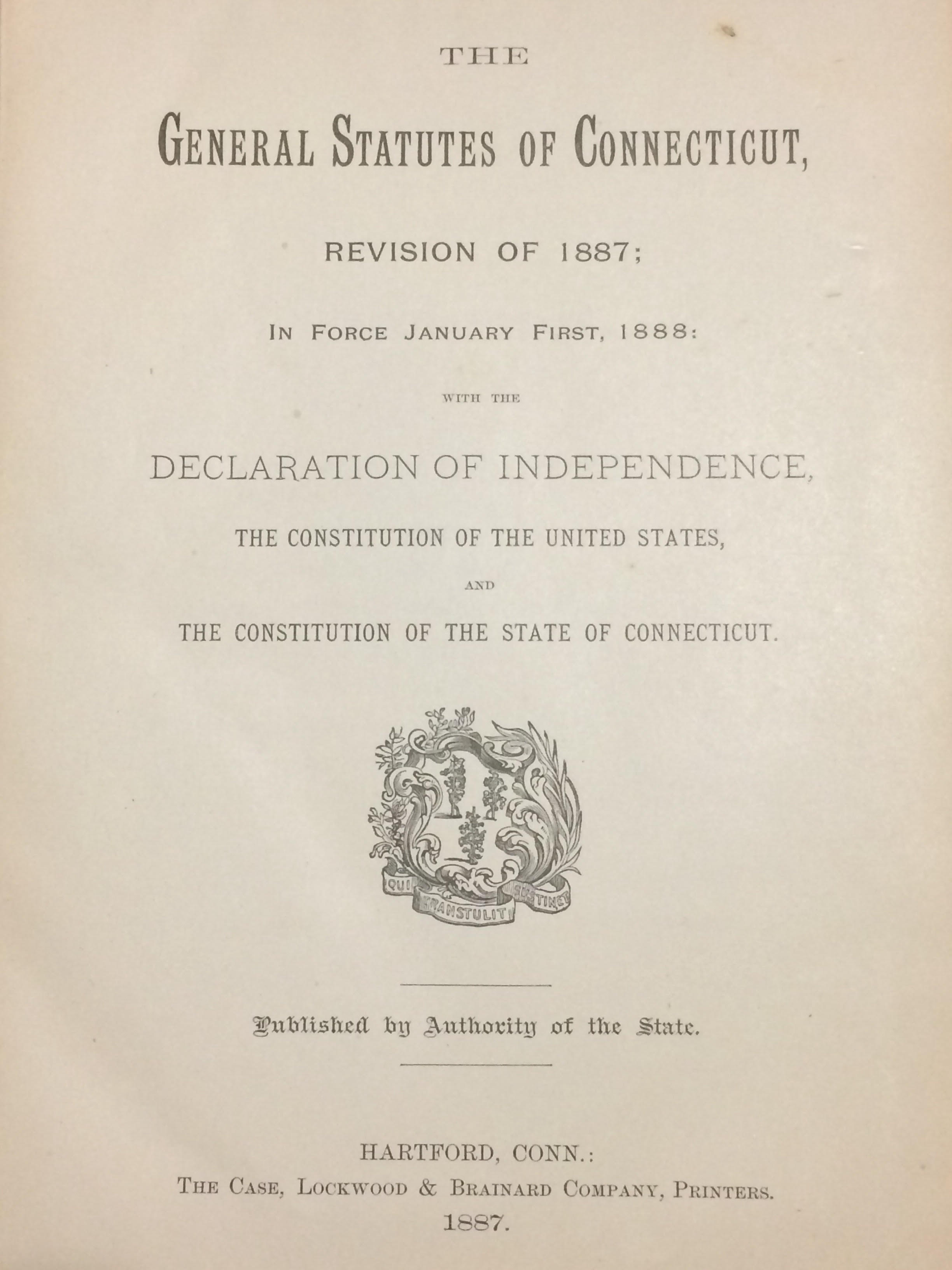
Title folio from the Connecticut General Statutes, Revision of 1887 (in force 1888).

The Connecticut General Statutes are official General Statutes of the U.S. state of Connecticut. Revised to 2017, the statutes contain all of Connecticut's public acts and certain special acts of the public nature, the Constitution of the United States, the Amendments to the Constitution of the United States, and the Constitution of the State of Connecticut, including its 31 amendments adopted since 1965.

=== Local ordinances ===
Locally elected representatives also develop Local ordinances to govern cities and towns. The town ordinances often include noise control and zoning guidelines. However, the State of Connecticut does also provide statewide ordinances for noise control as well.

== Climate change policy ==
The state of Connecticut passed a number of bills on global warming in the early to mid 1990s, including—in 1990—the first state global warming law to require specific actions for reducing CO_{2}.

Connecticut is one of the states that agreed, under the auspices of the New England Governors and Eastern Canadian Premiers (NEG/ECP), to a voluntary short-term goal of reducing regional greenhouse gas emissions to 1990 levels by 2010 and by 10 percent below 1990 levels by 2020. The NEG/ECP long-term goal is to reduce emissions to a level that eliminates any dangerous threats to the climate—a goal scientists suggest will require reductions 75 to 85 percent below current levels. These goals were announced in August 2001. The state has also acted to require additions in renewable electric generation by 2009.
