= G8+5 =

Organization

Group of Eight + Five
Members of the G8+5 are highlighted in dark green. Members of the European Union are highlighted in light green.
- Members of the G8: Canada; France; Germany; Italy; Japan; Russia (Suspended); United Kingdom; United States; European Union
- Additional members: Brazil; China; India; Mexico; South Africa
- Abbreviation: G8+5

The Group of Eight + Five (G8+5) was an international group that consisted of the leaders of the heads of government from the G8 nations (Canada, France, Germany, Italy, Japan, Russia, the United Kingdom, and the United States), plus the heads of government of the five leading emerging economies (Brazil, China, India, Mexico, and South Africa). In March 2014, Russia was removed from the Group of 8 for annexing Crimea, so the G8+5 in its original form is unlikely to reconvene with Russia present.

== February 2007 declaration ==
On February 16, 2007, The Global Legislators Organisation (GLOBE International) held a meeting of the G8+5 Climate Change Dialogue at the GLOBE Washington Legislators Forum in Washington, D.C., where a non-binding agreement was reached to cooperate on tackling global warming. The group accepted that the existence of man-made climate change was beyond doubt, and that there should be a global system of emission caps and carbon emissions trading applying to both industrialized nations and developing countries. The group hoped this policy to be in place by 2009, to supersede the Kyoto Protocol, the first phase of which expires in 2012.

== Foundation ==
The G8+5 group was formed in 2005 when Tony Blair, then Prime Minister of the United Kingdom, in his role as host of the 31st G8 summit at Gleneagles, Scotland, invited the leading emerging countries to join the talks. The hope was that this would form a stronger and more representative group that would inject fresh impetus into the trade talks at Doha, and the need to achieve a deeper cooperation on climate change.

Following the meeting, the countries issued a joint statement looking to build a "new paradigm for international cooperation" in the future.

The G8+5 Climate Change Dialogue was launched on February 24, 2006, by the (GLOBE) in partnership with the Com+ alliance of communicators for sustainable development.

== Institutionalization attempt ==
Following the 33rd G8 summit, Heiligendamm 2007, German chancellor Angela Merkel announced the establishment of the "Heiligendamm Process" through which the full institutionalization of the permanent dialogue between the G8 countries and the five greatest emerging economies will be implemented. This will include the establishment of a common G8 and G5 platform at the OECD.

On August 28, 2007, French president Nicolas Sarkozy in a foreign policy statement proposed that Brazil, China, India, Mexico and South Africa should become members of G8: "The G8 can't meet for two days and the G13 for just two hours.... That doesn't seem fitting, given the power of these five emerging countries."

Innovation, freedom of investment, development in Africa, and technology for reducing CO_{2} emissions were the four main issues this process visited in 2008 and 2009. A progress report was presented at the 2008 G8 Summit in Japan; a final report on the results of the dialogue was put forward in Italy in 2009. German Chancellor Angela Merkel supported this process, stating, "[W]e cannot get by, or shape globalization in a humane way, without each other".

Nevertheless, as of 2008, a formal enlargement of the G8 was not a realistic political option, since the G8 member states have diverging positions on this issue. The United States and Japan have been against enlargement, the United Kingdom and France actively in favour, and Italy, Germany, Russia and Canada are reserved on the issue..

The G14 was a proposed plan that would have added Egypt to the group. The plan was announced in 2008 when France and Italy advocated for expansion. It has not been actively pursued since Russia was suspended from the G8 in 2014.

== Leaders in March 2014 ==
The following list is a list of leaders of G8+5 in March 2014, when Russia was suspended from the G8. It is in alphabetical order by nation.

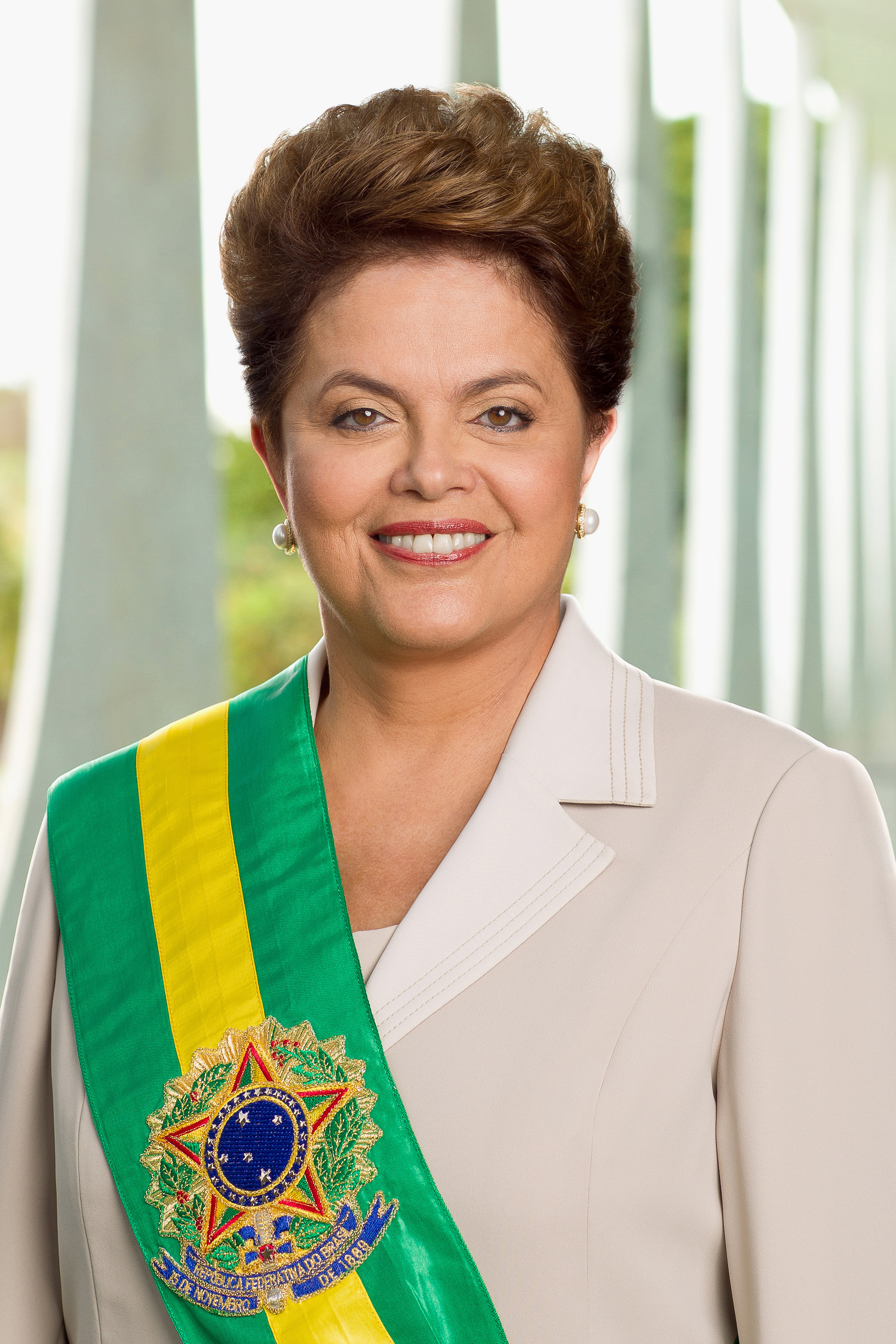
(Brazil) Brazil
Dilma Rousseff, President

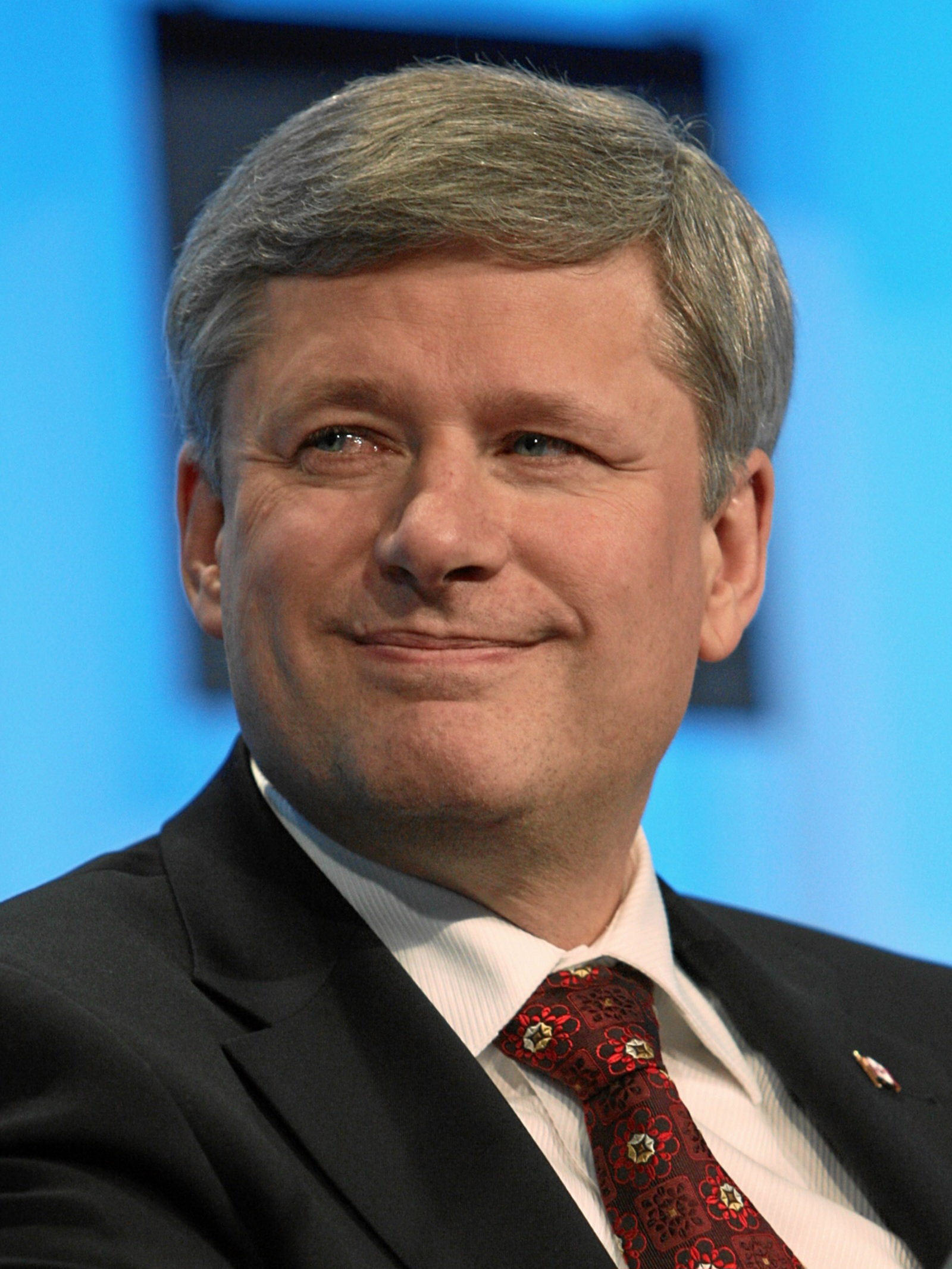
(Canada) Canada
Stephen Harper, Prime Minister

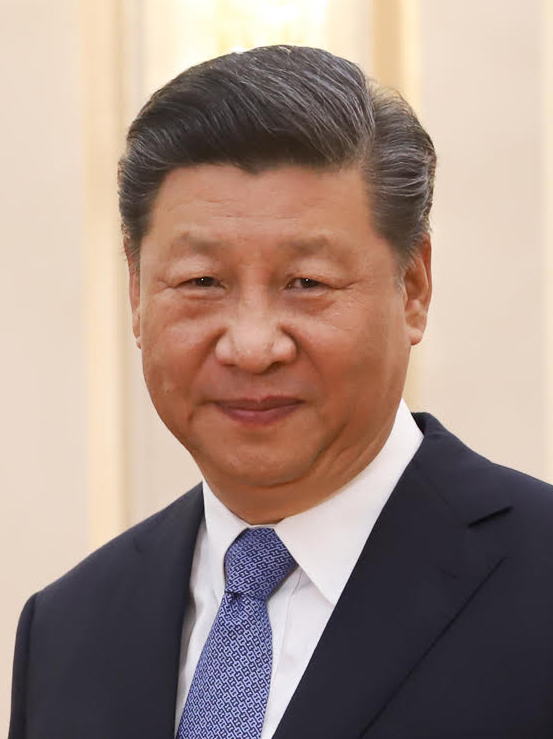
(China) China
Xi Jinping, President (Note: The de jure head of government of China is the Premier. The President of China is legally a ceremonial office and has no real power in China's political system. However, the General Secretary of the Chinese Communist Party (de facto leader) has always held this office since 1993 except for the months of transition, and the paramount leader is Xi Jinping.)

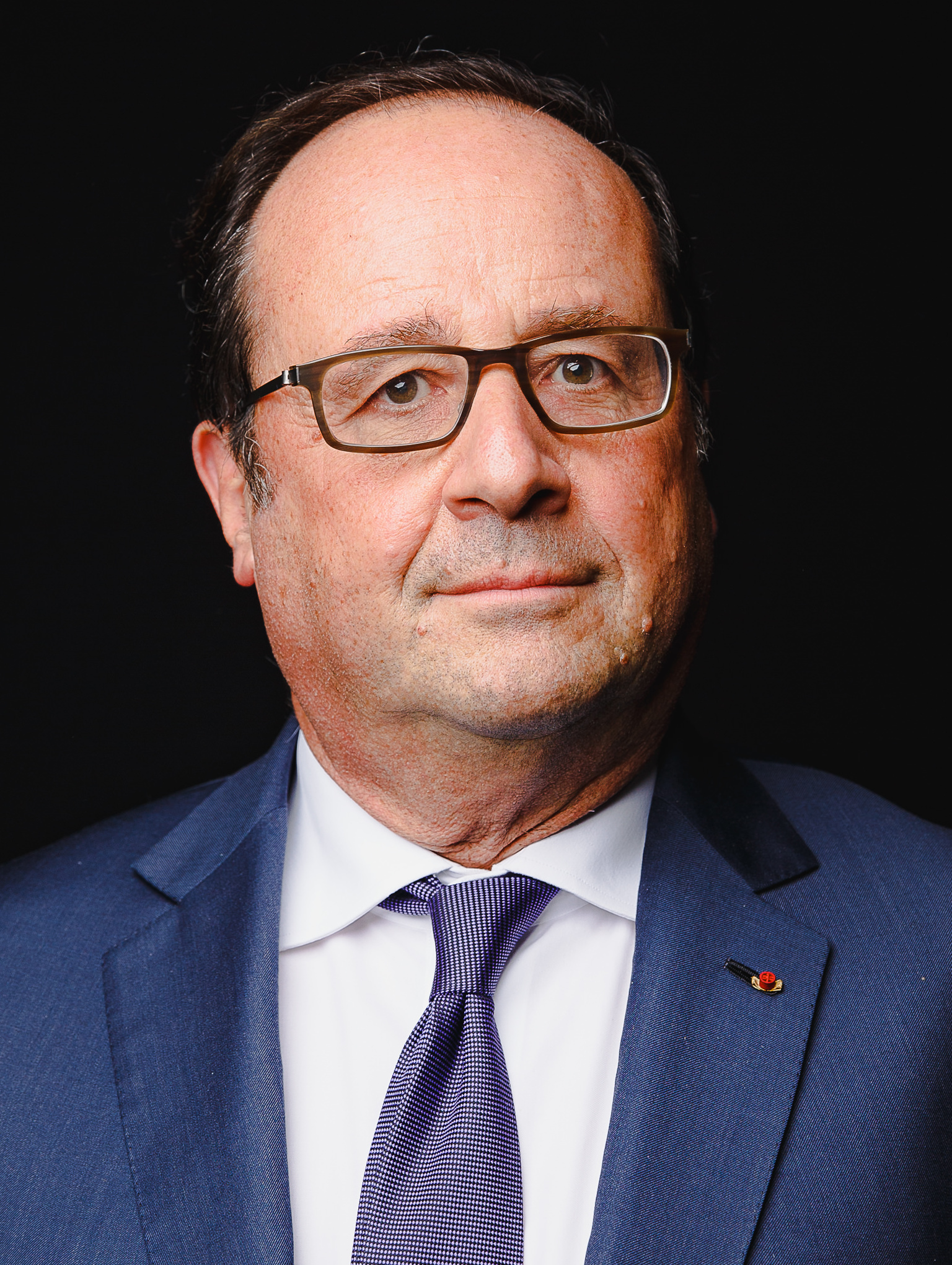
(France) France
François Hollande,
President

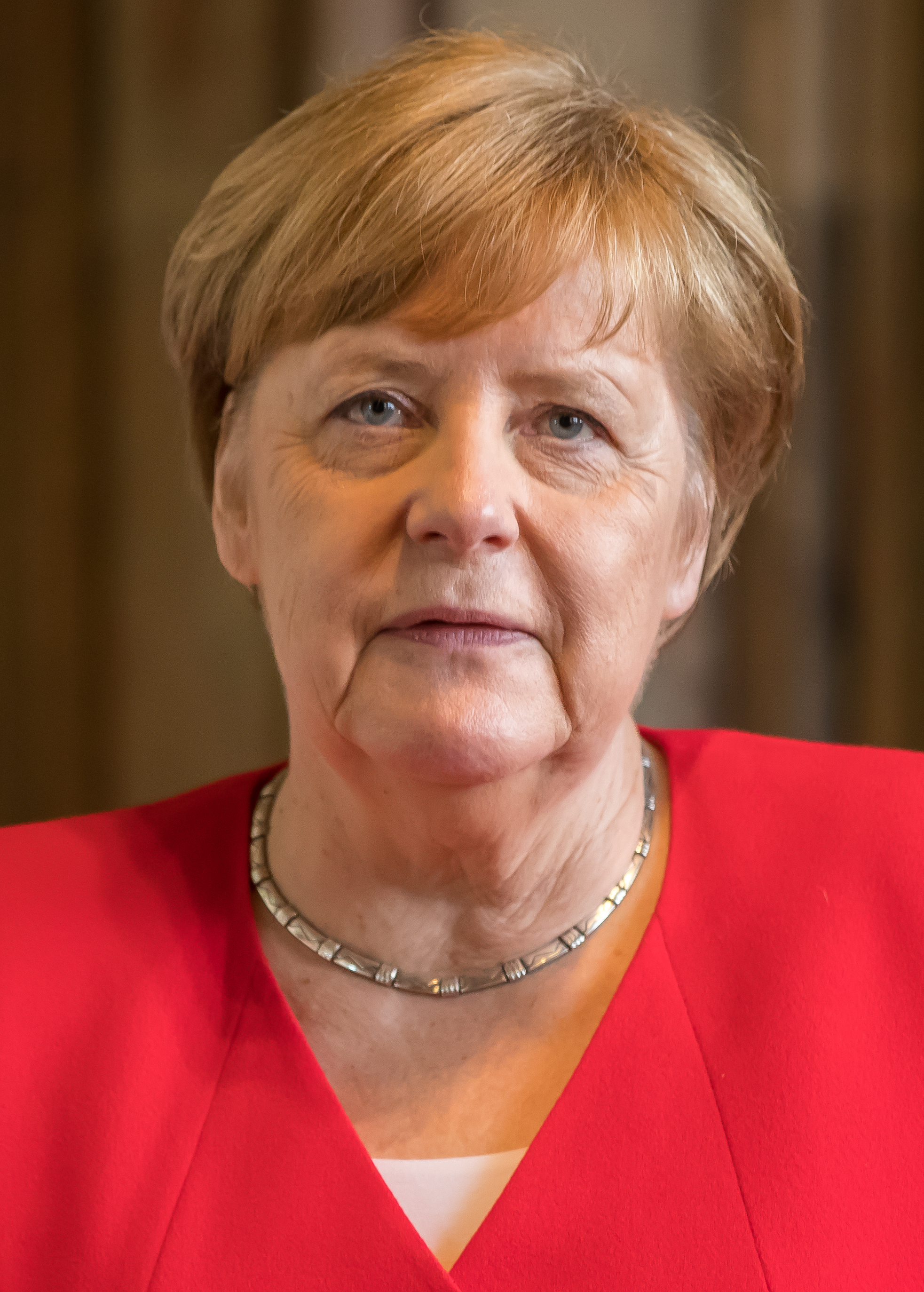
(Germany) Germany
Angela Merkel, Chancellor

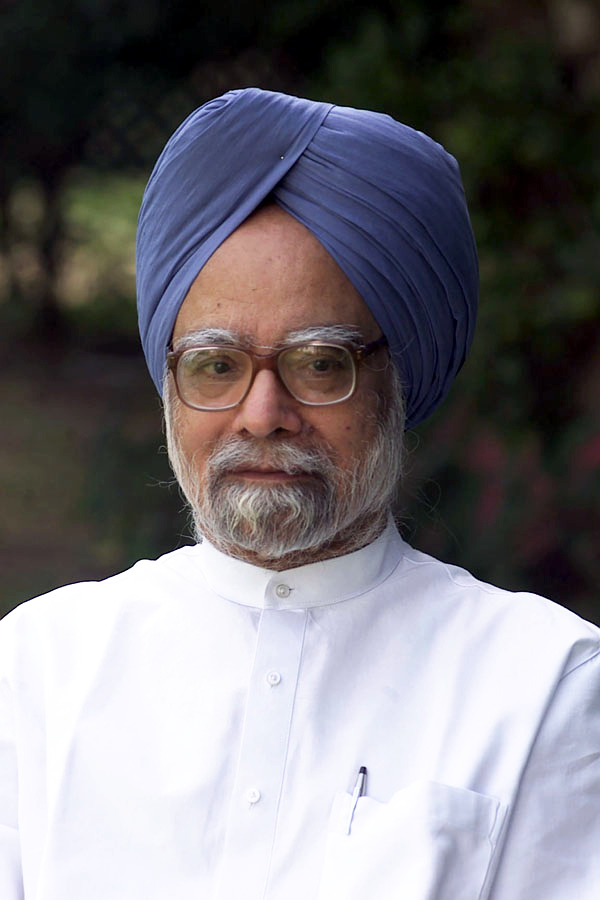
(India) India
Manmohan Singh, Prime Minister

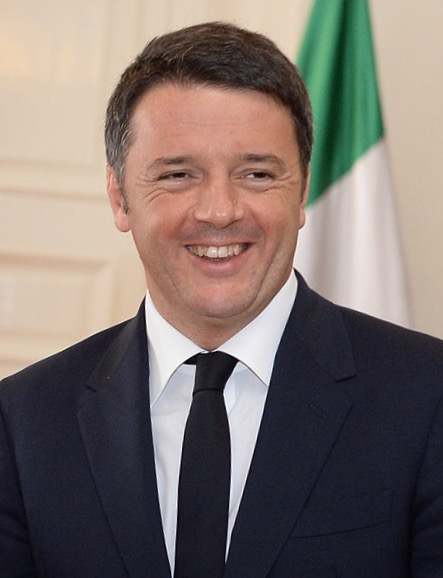
(Italy) Italy
Matteo Renzi,
Prime Minister

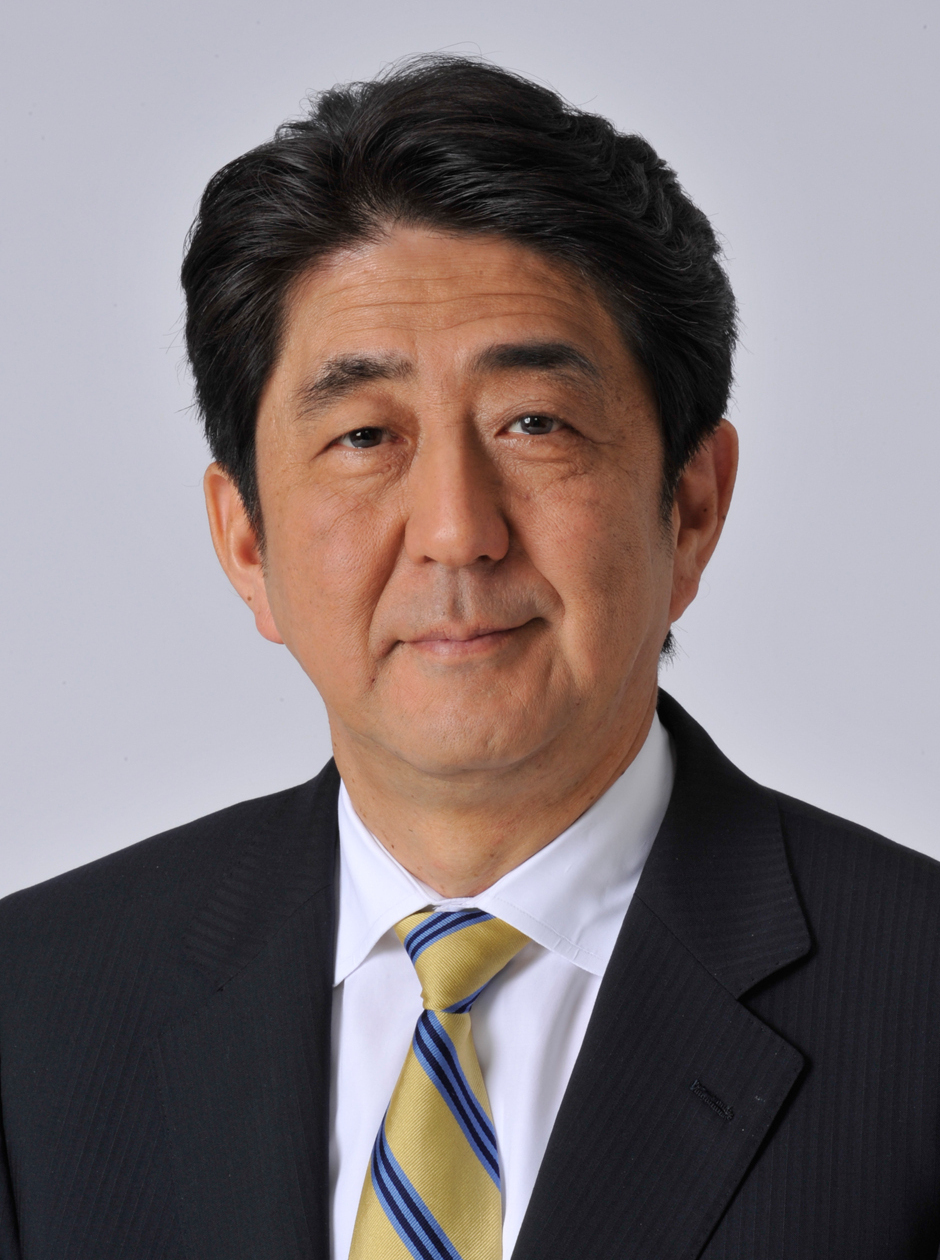
(Japan) Japan
Shinzo Abe, Prime Minister

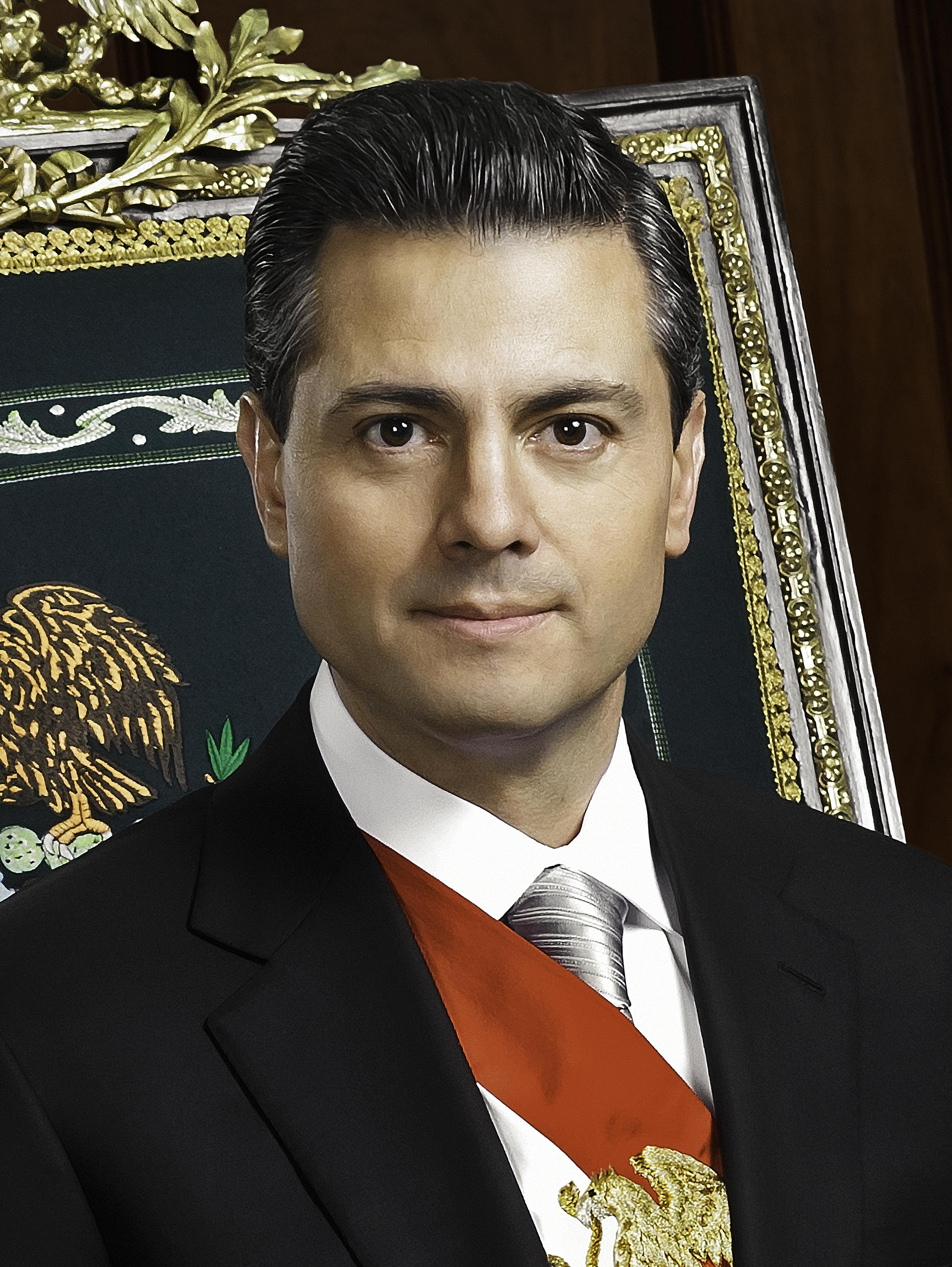
(Mexico) Mexico
Enrique Peña Nieto, President

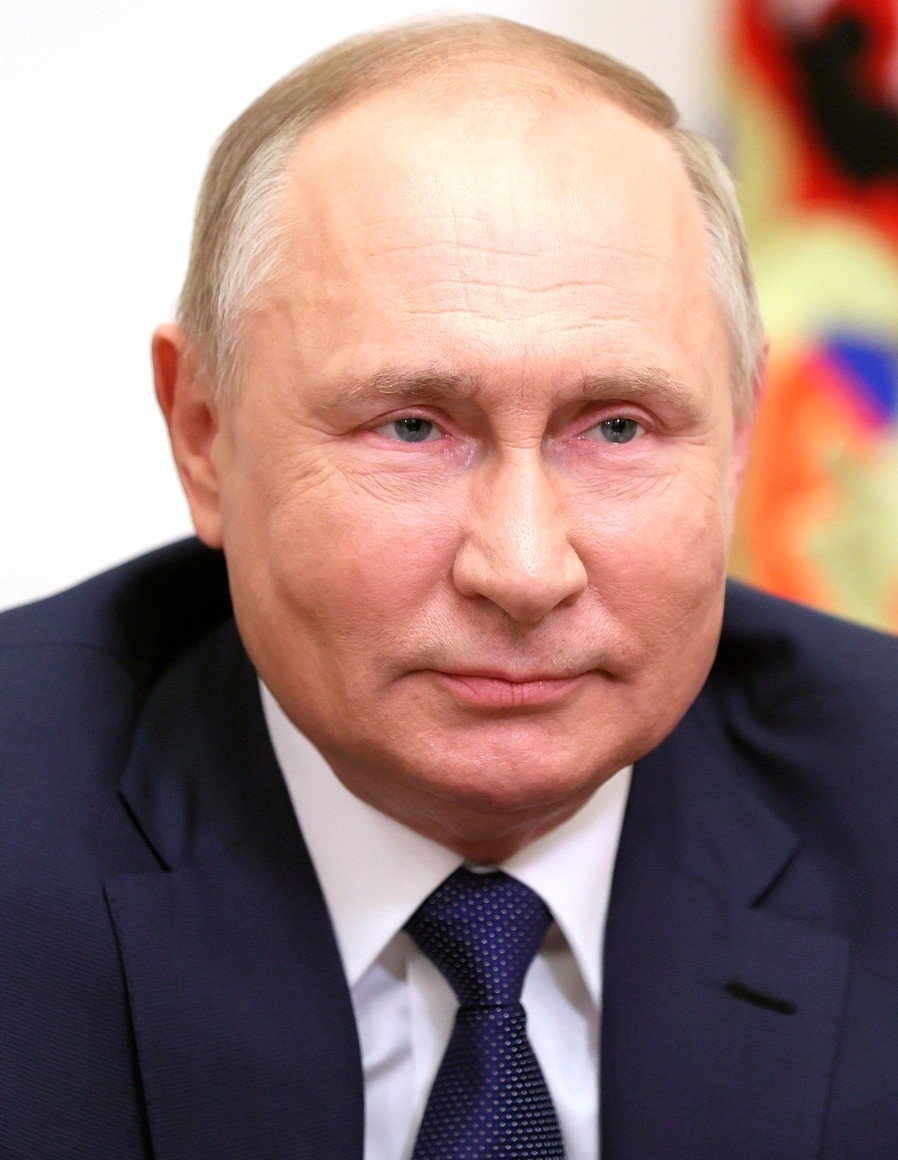
(Russia) Russia
Vladimir Putin, President

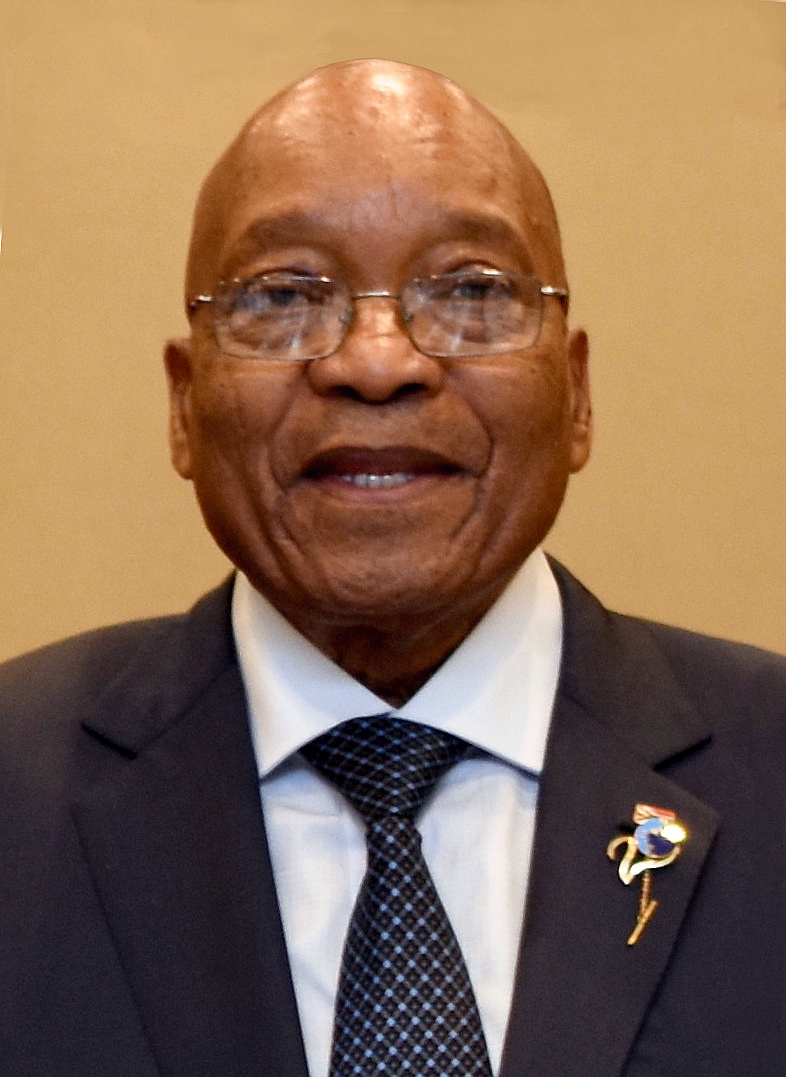
(South Africa) South Africa
Jacob Zuma, President

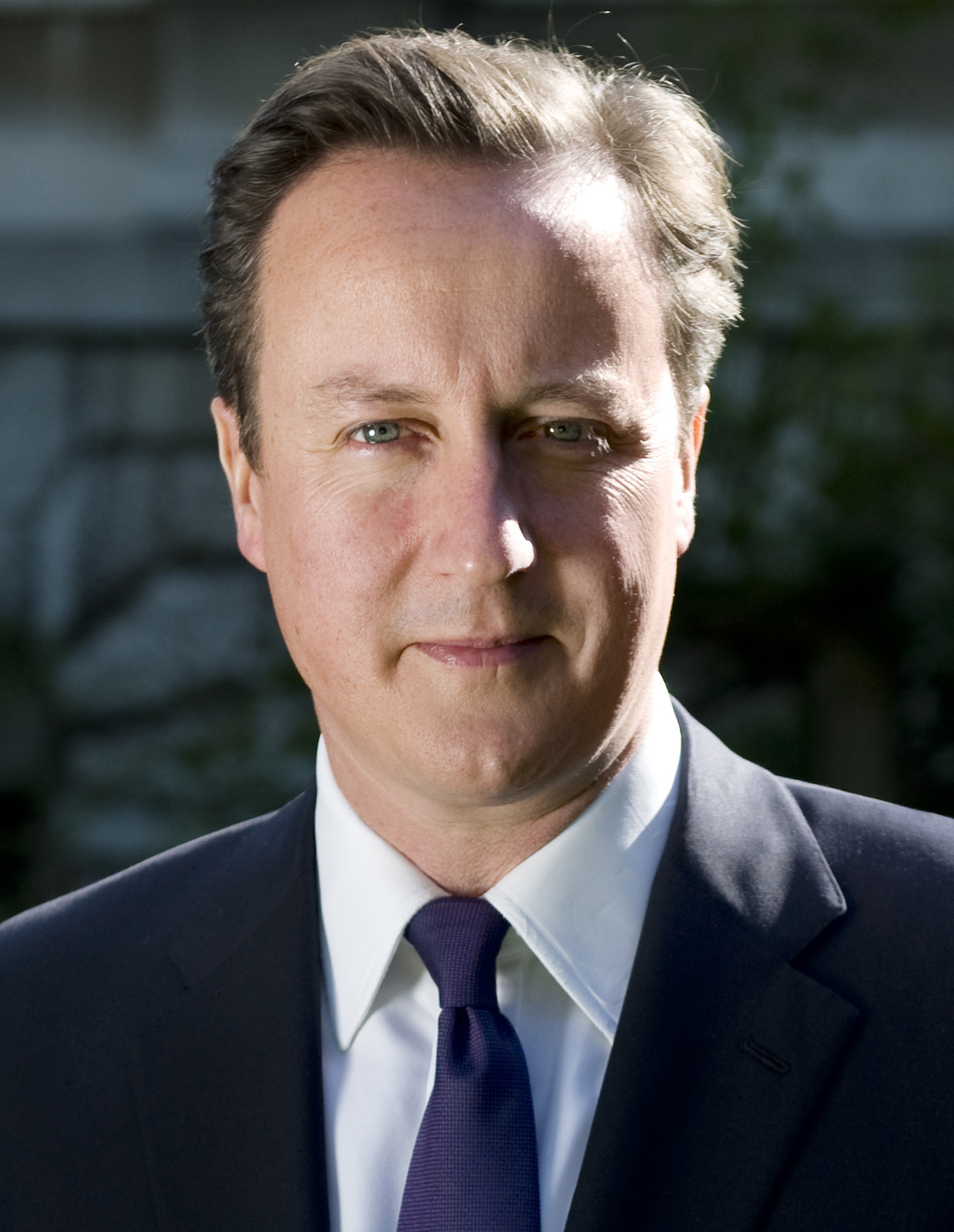
United Kingdom
David Cameron, Prime Minister

(United States) United States
Barack Obama, President

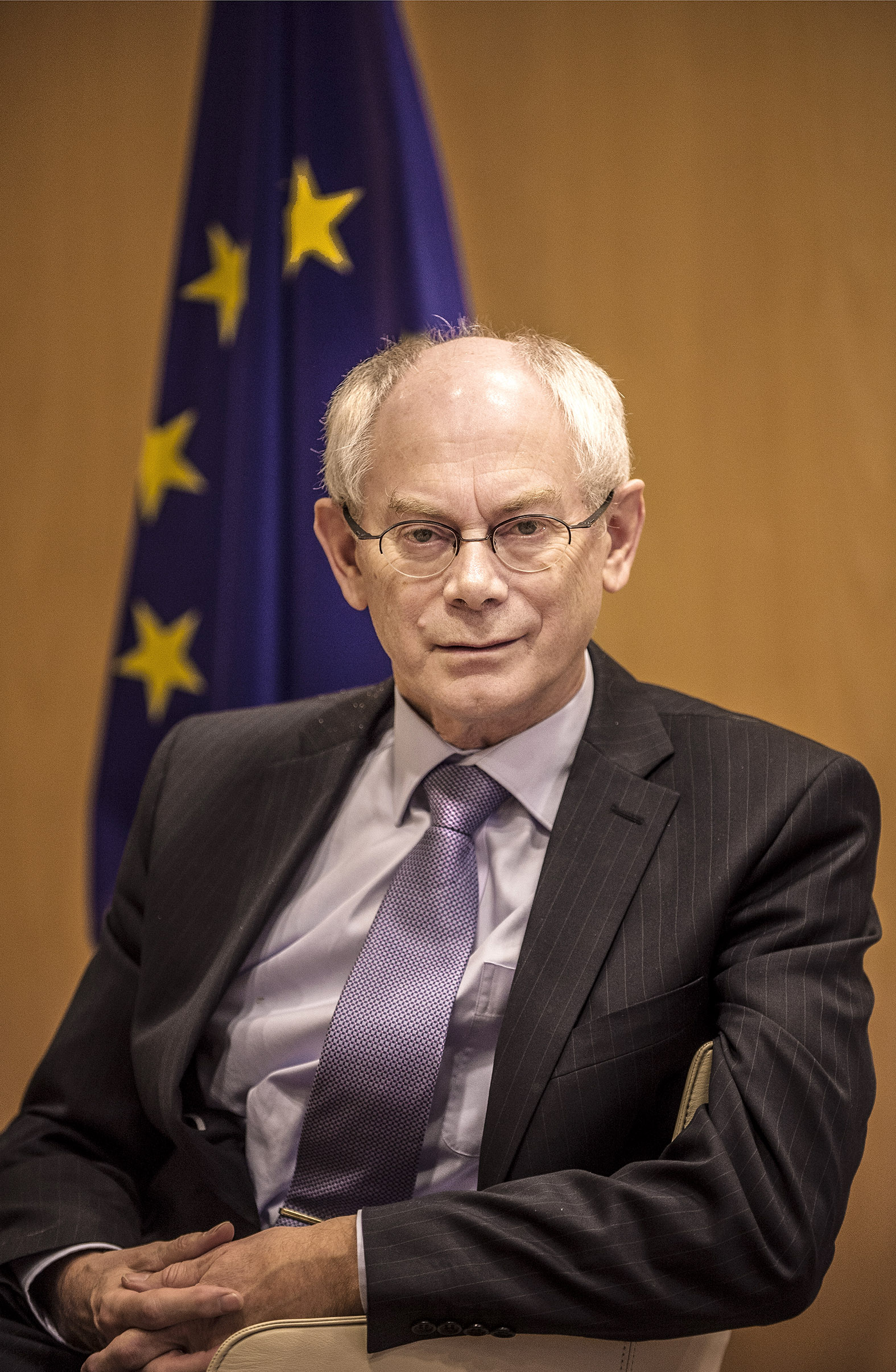
(European Union) European Union
Herman Van Rompuy, President of the European Council

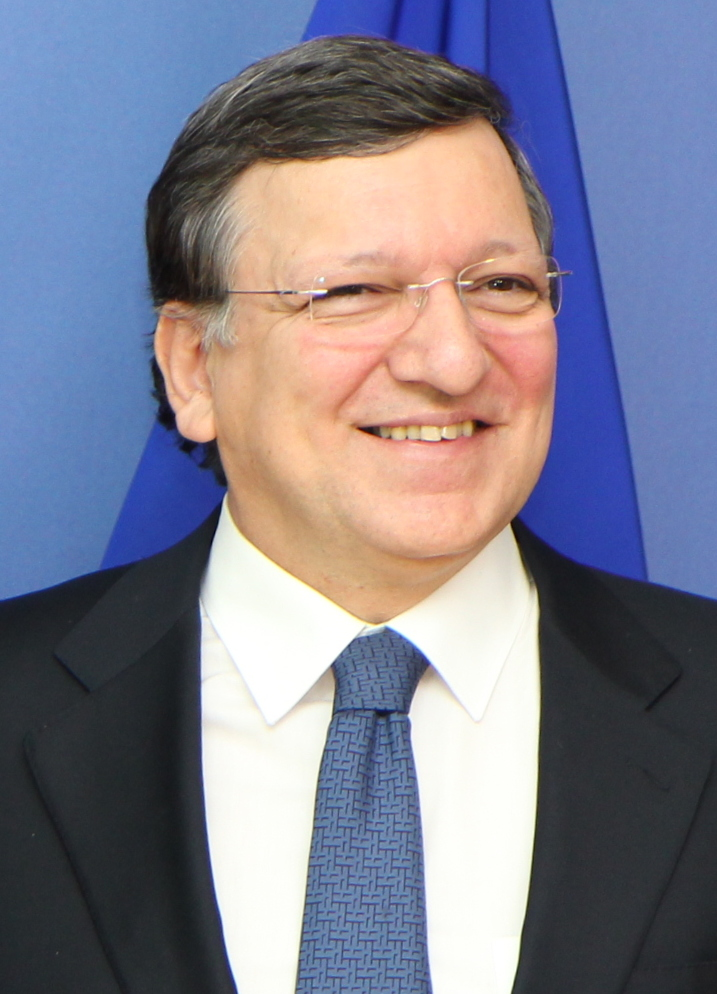
(European Union) European Union
José Manuel Barroso, President of the European Commission

== See also ==
- Avoiding Dangerous Climate Change
- BRICS
- MIKTA
- Gleneagles Dialogue
- List of country groupings
- List of multilateral free-trade agreements
- Group of Nine
- Big Four (Western Europe)
- G4 nations
- Group of Twelve
- Group of 15
