= General Statutes =

General Statutes may refer to:

== Terms ==
- Statutes at Large
- Organic statute
- Statutes

== Governments codes ==
- Connecticut General Statutes
- North Carolina General Statutes, part of the law of North Carolina
- Basic Statute of Oman

== See also ==
- Statutory law
- Statute book
