= Sea ice refreezing =

Climate engineering approach

Sea ice refreezing refers to various climate engineering techniques aimed at directly facilitating the formation or restoration of ice in polar regions, particularly in the Arctic Ocean. These approaches are being investigated as potential interventions to counter the accelerating loss of sea ice due to climate change, especially to avert a potential blue ocean event and its potential runaway climate impacts.

== Background ==
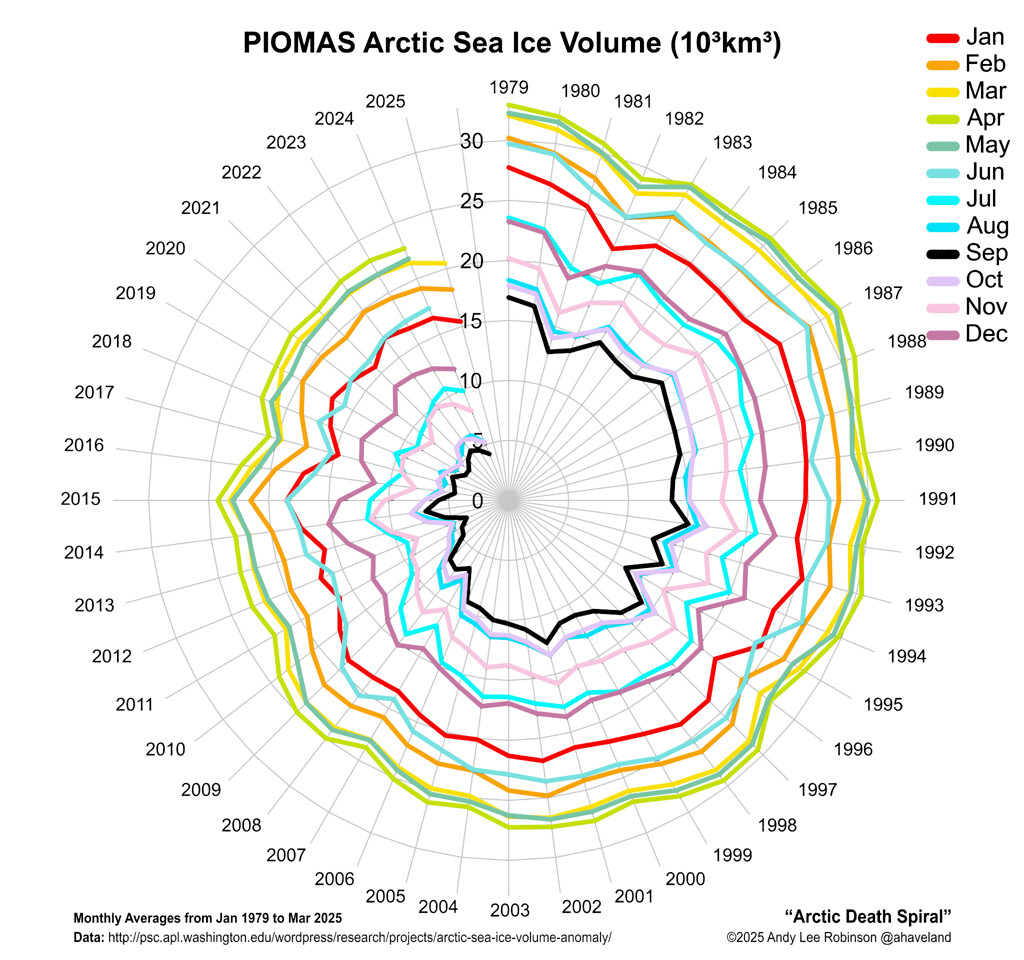
Month-by-month chart shows how minimum ice volume usually occurs in September, and maxima usually occurring in April.

Sea ice, especially in the Arctic region, has declined in recent decades in area and volume due to climate change. It has been melting more in summer than it refreezes in winter. Global warming, caused by greenhouse gas forcing is responsible for the decline in Arctic sea ice. The decline of sea ice has been accelerating during the early twenty-first century, with a decline rate of 4.7% per decade (it has declined over 50% since the first satellite records). Summertime sea ice will likely cease to exist sometime during the 21st century.

Sea ice loss is one of the main drivers of Arctic amplification, the phenomenon that the Arctic warms faster than the rest of the world under climate change. It is plausible that sea ice decline also makes the jet stream weaker, which would cause more persistent and extreme weather in mid-latitudes.

== Techniques ==
=== Ice seeding ===
In 2025, researchers at Purdue University led by Tian Li developed a modified wood material, termed "ice-wood," designed to facilitate ice formation in marine environments. The team selected wood as their base material due to its natural properties and lower environmental impact compared to synthetic alternatives.

The ice-wood material is fabricated from American basswood (Tilia americana). To modify the material, a section is removed from a 10×10×1.5 centimeter piece of basswood, which undergoes partial carbonization on one side. The larger remaining piece is treated with hydrogen peroxide and heat to extract lignin, after which the carbonized section is reinserted into the larger piece. The removal of lignin, which gives wood its characteristic color, renders the treated portion significantly whiter and more reflective. The resulting modifications create a dual-surface material, with each side having distinct thermal properties.

The ice-wood helps to seed the formation of ice through a combination of physical processes. When deployed, water rises through the ice-wood's natural microchannels via capillary action. Solar radiation heats the carbonized dark section, causing water evaporation. From there, water vapor re-condenses on the colder, lignin-depleted white surface. The elevated position of the structure combined with its reflective properties allows the surface to maintain sub-freezing temperatures even when ambient air temperatures rise several degrees above freezing, facilitating ice formation. In controlled tests conducted in 2.0 °C (35.6 °F) water, the ice-wood's surface remained below freezing despite ambient air temperatures reaching 7.0–8.0 °C (44.6–46.4 °F). Ice formation was observed beginning at the edges of the material and extending outward.

==== Potential applications ====
Purdue researchers determined that while covering the entire Arctic with ice-wood would impractical, that it was feasible to deploy larger units in coastal areas, particularly for Indigenous communities who depend on sea ice for fishing and hunting activities. The technology would intend to accelerate winter ice formation and reduce summer melt rates.

Computer modeling examining hypothetical widespread deployment of ice-wood throughout the Arctic from 2005 to 2022 indicated that by the 2022 melting season, the technology could have increased ice growth rates by approximately 0.3 centimeters per day. The models also predicted that the deployment would reduce sea surface temperatures by approximately 3.0 °C (37.4 °F) compared to actual 2022 measurements.

Proponents of the technology note several factors favoring potential large-scale implementation. These include that wood is relatively inexpensive and abundant in nature, the lignin removal process is already performed at industrial scale in paper manufacturing, and that the production methods employ other established technologies.

==== Criticism ====
Some climate researchers such as Cecilia Bitz at the University of Washington, expressed skepticism about the technology's effectiveness during Arctic summers, when air temperatures typically reach around 10.0 °C (50.0 °F)—potentially too warm for the ice-wood to maintain freezing conditions at its surface. Other climate researchers including Julienne Stroeve at University College London questioned the allocation of resources toward such interventions rather than focusing on reducing carbon dioxide emissions.

=== Seawater pumping ===
One approach Arctic refreezing involves drilling through the existing winter ice layer to access the ocean water beneath, then pumping this water onto the snow cover atop the ice. The approach was initially proposed by Steven Desch and colleagues at Arizona State University in 2016. The process is based upon how when seawater saturates the snow layer, it fills air pockets within the snow structure. The water-saturated snow freezes, effectively converting snow to solid ice and increases the thermal conductivity of the ice sheet. According to the research team, the resulting enhanced thermal conductivity allows cold Arctic air temperatures to penetrate more efficiently through the ice, accelerating natural ice formation on existing ice sheet's underside. The research team's early modeling suggested that implementing this approach across just 10% of the Arctic could potentially reverse recent ice loss in the polar region.

==== Proposed implementation ====
In 2024, a United Kingdom-based organization called Real Ice, working in collaboration with the University of Cambridge's Centre for Climate Repair, conducted field trials of seawater pumping technology in Cambridge Bay on Victoria Island, Canada. In the study, test sites with a single borehole demonstrated ice thickening of approximately 50 centimetres (20 in) compared to control sites between January and May, while stimulating an additional 25 centimetres (9.8 in) of natural ice growth on the ice sheet's underside. The saline water created during the freezing process successfully percolated back through the ice into the ocean rather than forming a detrimental surface layer that could weaken the ice structure. The resulting thickened ice maintained the structural integrity necessary to extend its lifespan through seasonal warming periods, according to Real Ice.

Following the promising results of initial testing, Real Ice has begun developing more advanced implementation systems. The company has established a partnership with the BioRobotics Institute at the Sant'Anna School of Advanced Studies in Pisa, Italy, to design autonomous underwater drones capable of navigating beneath Arctic ice sheets, creating boreholes at strategic locations, and pumping seawater onto the ice surface. Real Ice faculty believed that it could cover approximately 2 square kilometres (0.77 sq mi) per drone per winter season.

According to estimates by Real Ice, meaningful climate intervention would require the treatment of approximately 1 million square kilometres (390,000 sq mi) of Arctic sea ice, and the deployment of roughly 500,000 autonomous drones resulting in the production of an additional 500 cubic kilometers of sea ice each winter. The company estimated annual operational costs of approximately $6 billion. According to development timelines announced in 2024, prototype drones were scheduled for completion in 2025, with Arctic field testing planned for the winter of 2026–2027.

==== Criticism ====
Critics stated that operation of hundreds of thousands of seawater pumps would require significant energy resources, potentially creating carbon emissions that could partially offset its climate benefits unless powered by renewable sources. Some climate researchers, such as Woodwell Climate Research Center senior scientist Jennifer Francis, questioned whether such interventions could be deployed at sufficient scale to meaningfully impact Arctic ice conditions, particularly given the accelerating pace of climate change. Furthermore, polar researchers such University of Bristol associate professor Liz Bagshaw, expressed concern regarding the potential disruption to Arctic wildlife, especially regarding the existing vulnerability of the Arctic ecosystem. This included the possible impact of a reduction in snow cover that some species require for denning and breeding activities.

== See also ==
- Arctic Ice Project
- Arctic geoengineering
- List of climate engineering topics
