= Dennis Tirpak =

Climate change scientist

Dennis Tirpak is a climate change scientist.

Tirpak was the director of the Global Climate Change Policy Division at the United States Environmental Protection Agency from 1984–1992. He was the coordinator of science and technology at the United Nations Framework Convention on Climate Change for nine years. He was the head of the climate change unit at the Organisation for Economic Co-operation and Development (OECD) for three years.

Tirpak is one of the coordinating lead authors of the Intergovernmental Panel on Climate Change, which shared the 2007 Nobel Peace Prize with former US Vice President Al Gore. He is an associate of the International Institute for Sustainable Development in Canada, and a senior fellow at the World Resources Institute in Washington, D.C.

Tirpak was the chairman of the International Scientific Steering Committee for Avoiding Dangerous Climate Change Symposium on Stabilisation of Greenhouse Gas Concentrations in February 2005.

In 1989 he and Joel B. Smith co-authored the first report on global warming to Congress, The Potential Effects Of Global Climate Change on the United States.

== See also ==
- Global warming
- Montreal Protocol
