= List of climate engineering topics =

Climate engineering geoengineering topics related to greenhouse gas remediation include:

== Solar radiation management ==
- Solar radiation management
- Stratospheric aerosol injection (climate engineering)
- Marine cloud brightening
- Cool roof
- Space sunshade
- Stratospheric Particle Injection for Climate Engineering

== Carbon dioxide removal ==
- Carbon dioxide removal
- Biochar
- Bio-energy with carbon capture and storage
- Direct air capture
- Ocean fertilization
- Enhanced weathering

=== Other greenhouse gas remediation ===
- Greenhouse gas removal
- CFC laser photochemistry

== Other projects ==
- Arctic geoengineering
- Cirrus Cloud Thinning
- Sea ice refreezing
