= Connecticut General Statutes =

Codification of the law of Connecticut, US

The Connecticut General Statutes, also called the General Statutes of Connecticut and abbreviated Conn. Gen. Stat., is a codification of the law of Connecticut. Revised to 2017, it contains all of the public acts of Connecticut and certain special acts of the public nature, the Constitution of the United States, the Amendments to the Constitution of the United States, and the Constitution of the State of Connecticut, including its 31 amendments adopted since 1965. The earliest predecessor to the currently in force codification dates to 1650.

== History ==
=== Colonial codifications ===
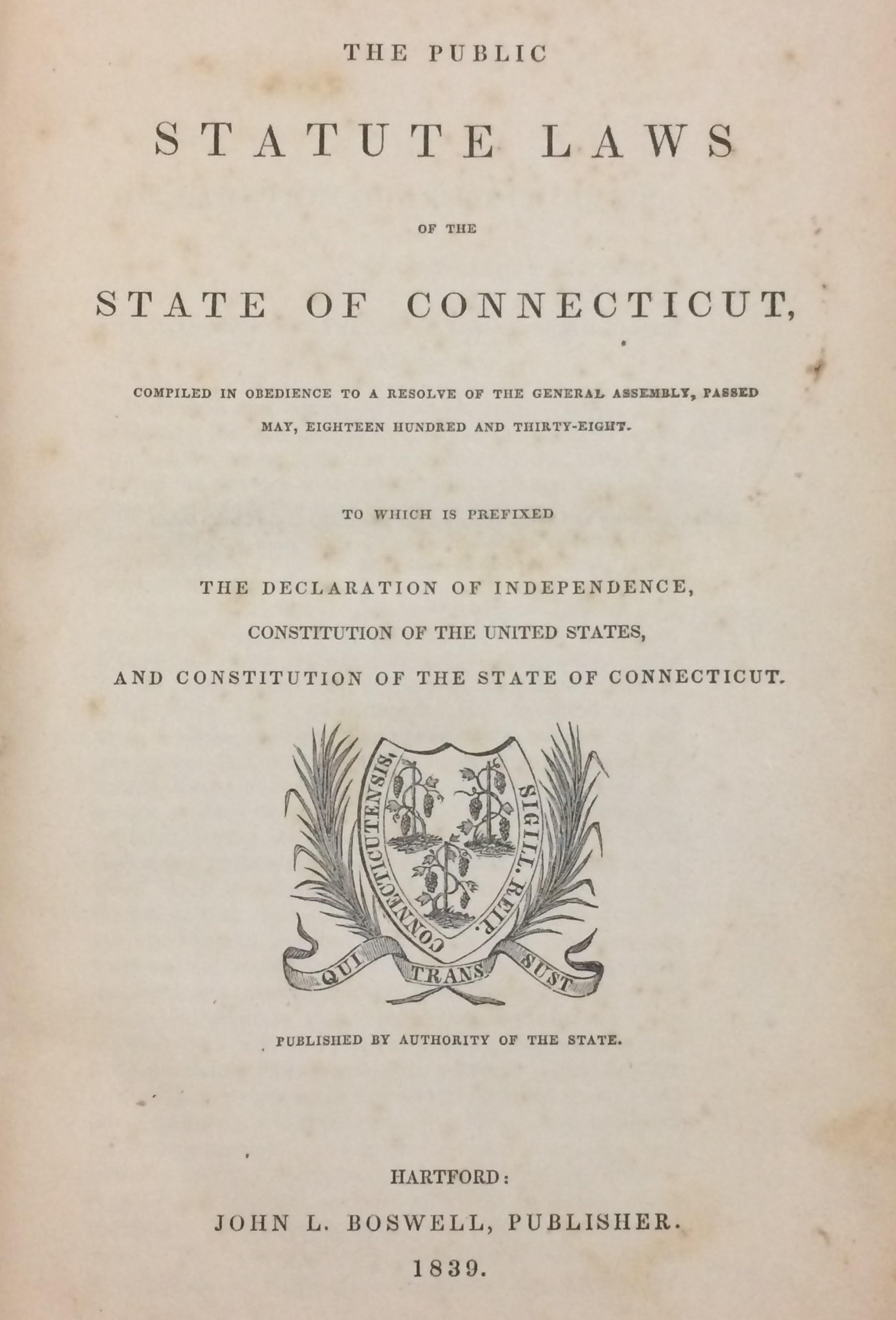
Title folio from the Connecticut General Statutes, Revision of 1838 (published 1839).

The first code was from 1650. Originally, the first revision of the early laws and orders of Connecticut was not printed. Prior to the revision of 1672, which was printed in 1675, the laws and orders of the General Court were promulgated only by manuscript copies. They were recorded in the public records of the court, and also in the town records, and it was made the duty of the constables of the several towns to publish such laws as should be made from time to time, and annually, to read the capital news at some public meeting. The laws were few and simple, yet they were such as the exigencies of the commonwealth required, and such as may be supposed to exist in the infancy of civil governments. The Connecticut Supreme Court struck down the "Blue Laws" in 1979 as an unconstitutional breach of the due process and equal protection clauses of the United States Constitution.

=== Since 1818 ===
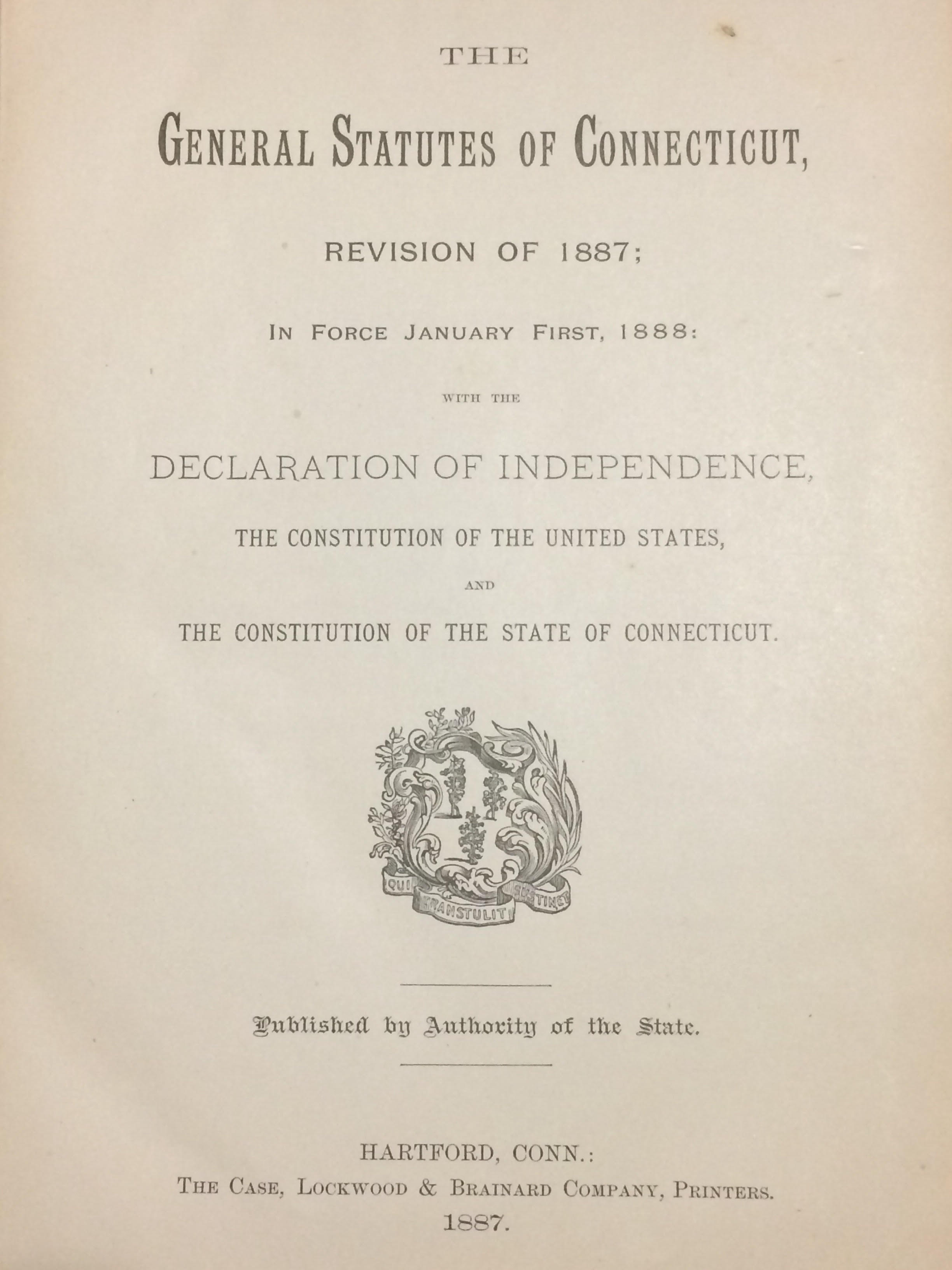
Title folio from the Connecticut General Statutes, Revision of 1887 (in force 1888).

Since the famous constitution of 1818 was adopted, revisions have occurred at intervals of a few years; although the first, that of 1821, was in force for a quarter century. In 1835, references to judicial decisions were printed for the first time; and some years afterwards, the Secretary began to publish separately the Private Acts, which in 1870 had accumulated to six volumes.

The districts were rearranged in 1842; and in 1847, a commission consisting of Governor Dutton, Judge Waldo, and Francis Fellowes, was appointed to make a new revision, known as that of 1849; Dutton and Waldo, with David B. Booth, served again in the same way in 1864. This revision was known as that of 1865.

Before many years had passed, the need of another revision was felt, and another commission was appointed to make a new revision, with the view to classifying, consolidating, and supplying omissions and giving notes and references according to its judgment. Many ancient titles which had become obsolete, as Concerning Slavery Taverners, and the like, were left out; many penalties and fines were changed because inadequate or expressed in antiquated terms; and by careful condensation, the whole mass of statues was abridged to a volume little larger than the previous one. This was the revision of 1875.

From the Code of 1650 to the Revision of 1958 (currently in force), 16 complete revisions have been done. From 1918 to 1972, revision updates were carried out by means of supplements.

== Latest revision ==
The latest revision incorporates all public acts and certain special acts of the public nature, passed from 1959 through 2016, in effect on January 1, 2017, except that any section which has been repealed, been repealed by implication or become obsolete is not included if such section was never printed in a previously revised volume but only appeared in one or more of the several supplements to the General Statutes issued since 1959.

=== Structure ===
The Connecticut General Statutes are divided into Titles as the top heading. Titles are subdivided into Chapters (Articles in the Uniform Commercial Code), which are in turn subdivided into Sections. Sections contain the actual text of the statutes.

- Title
  - Chapter
  - Article (UCC)
    - Section

=== Manner of statutory citation ===
A legal citation to, for example, Title 14, Section 219, of the Connecticut General Statutes would read "Conn. Gen. Stat. Sec. 14-219".
