= Fundamental Orders of Connecticut =

1639–62 political charter of the Connecticut Colony

The Fundamental Orders were adopted by the Connecticut Colony council on 24 January 1639 [O.S. 14 January 1638]. The Fundamental Orders describe the structure and powers of the government set up by the Connecticut River towns in a driven attempt for the folks of Connecticut to lead Godly lives. The Orders were also designed to give the government access to the open ocean for trading.

The Orders are often considered to be the first example of a written constitution in America, and within the orders, there is an emphasis on the limitation of powers of certain government positions and involvement of the common folk within government rather than exclusively by the gentry. Connecticut has even earned its nickname of The Constitution State because of this. The document is also notable as it assigns supreme authority in the colony to the elected general court, omitting any reference to the authority of the British Crown or other external authority. In 1662, the colony petitioned the king for a royal charter, which substantially secured the colony's right to self-govern following the same form of government established by the Fundamental Orders. However, most consider the Charter as just a reiteration of the policies found in the Fundamental Orders. With the involvement of common folk within government, as well as other rights such as not having requirements for the Freedmen to vote and giving them access to said vote, the document could be considered one of the more democratic constitutions of its time and is vital to the blueprint for democracy within the American government.

== History ==
In the year 1634, a group of Puritans and others who were dissatisfied with the rate of Anglican reforms sought to establish an ecclesiastical society subject to their own rules and regulations. They also wanted to establish a form of government that allowed for more suffrage, which the Massachusetts Bay government did not allow. The prospect of Connecticut’s fertility was also a driving force.

The Massachusetts General Court granted them permission to settle the cities of Windsor, Wethersfield, and Hartford. Ownership of the land was called into dispute by the English holders of the Warwick Patent of 1631. The Massachusetts General Court established the March Commission to mediate the dispute and named Roger Ludlow as its head. The Commission named eight magistrates from the Connecticut towns to implement a legal system. The March commission expired in March 1636, after which the settlers continued to self-govern.

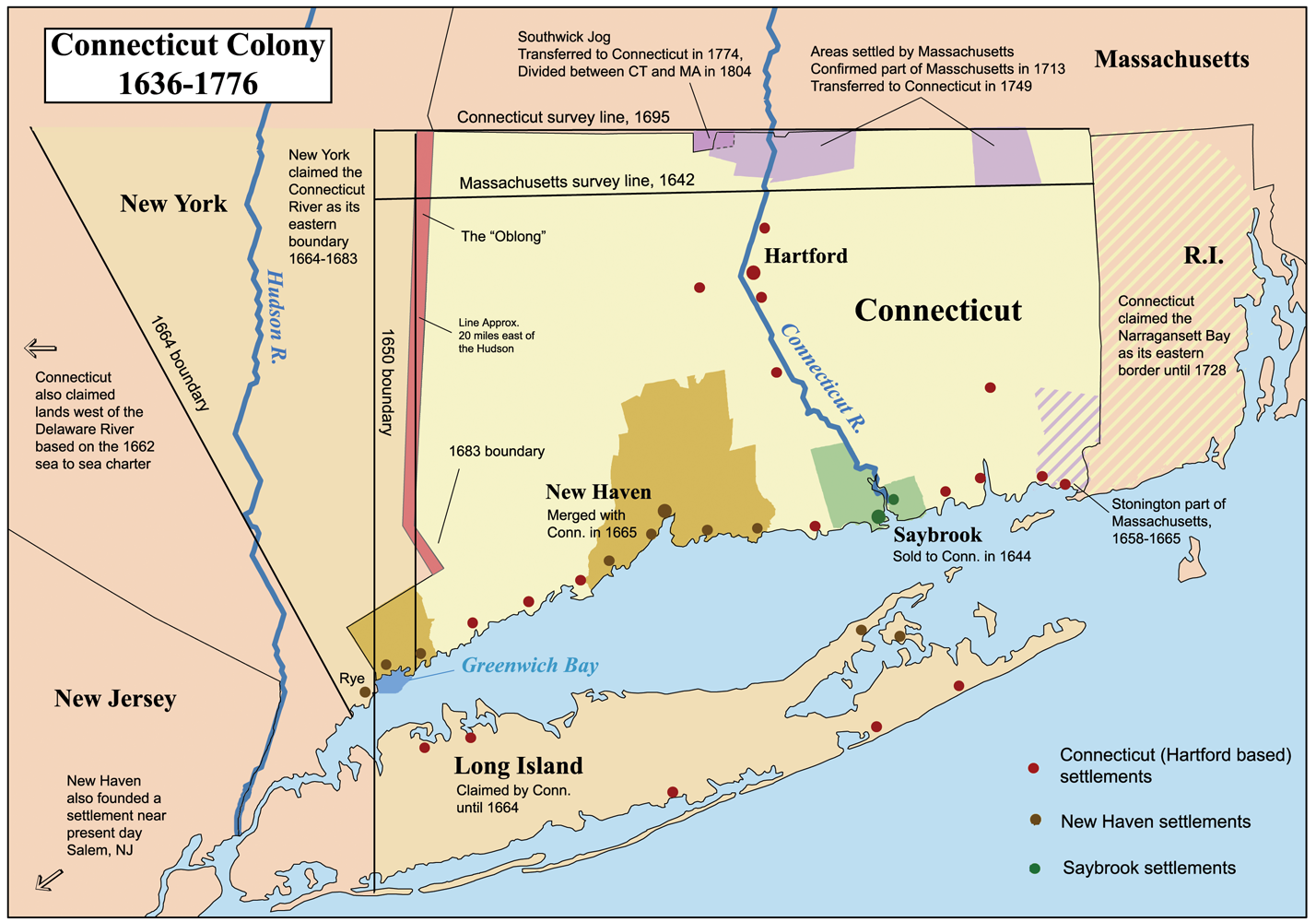
Map of Colonial Connecticut.

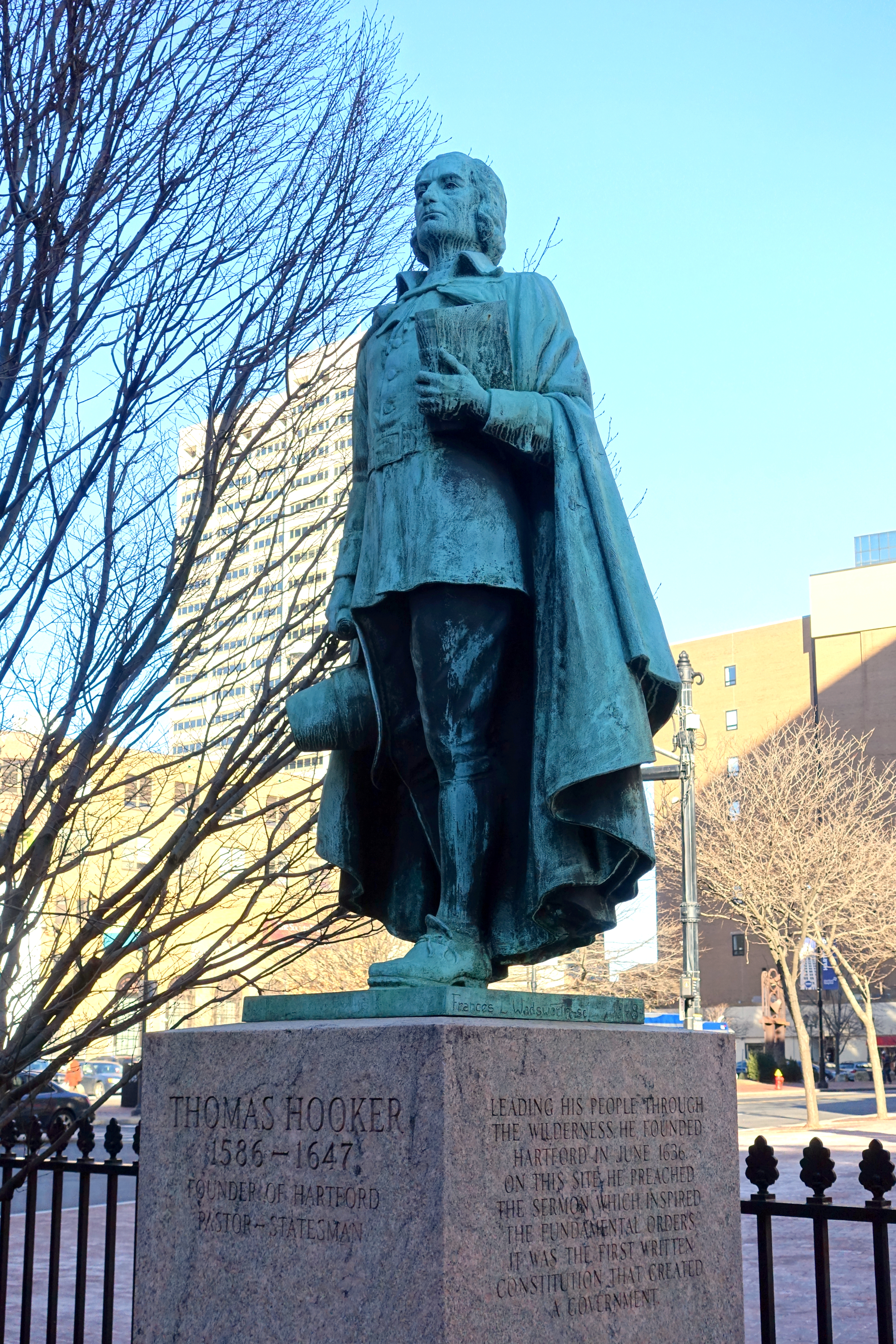
Thomas Hooker, the minister who gave the sermon that inspired the creation of the Orders.

On May 29, 1638, Ludlow wrote to Massachusetts Governor Winthrop that the colonists wanted to "unite ourselves to walk and lie peaceably and lovingly together." Additionally, a sermon conducted by Reverend Thomas Hooker on May 31, 1638, was an influential part in making the document. During this sermon, Hooker expressed his advocacy for a government that was run by the people and listed the following reasons.

“(1) that the choice of magistrates belongs unto the people by God’s allowance, (2) the privilege of election must be exercised according to the blessed will and law of God, (3) those who have power to appoint officers and magistrates have also power to set bounds and limitations of the powers and place unto which they call them.”

On January 14, 1639, a meeting was held by magistrates and committeemen in Hartford to conduct a draft of the Orders. These included figures such as Ludlow, John Haynes, John Mason and Thomas Welles, all trying to build upon Hooker's teachings. The Orders were fully adopted on January 14, 1639 O.S. (January 24, 1639 N.S.) and established Connecticut as a self-ruled colony.

There is no record of the debates or proceedings of the drafting or enactment of the Fundamental Orders. It is postulated that the framers wished to remain anonymous because England was watchful and suspicious of this vigorous infant colony; the commission from Massachusetts had expired. The orders were transcribed into the official Connecticut Colony records by the colony's secretary Thomas Welles.

"The men of the three towns were a law only to themselves. It is known that they were in earnest for the establishment of a government on broad lines; and it is certain that the ministers and captains, the magistrates and men of affairs, forceful in the settlements from the beginning, were the men who took the lead, guided the discussions, and found the root of the whole matter in the first written declaration of independence in these historical orders."

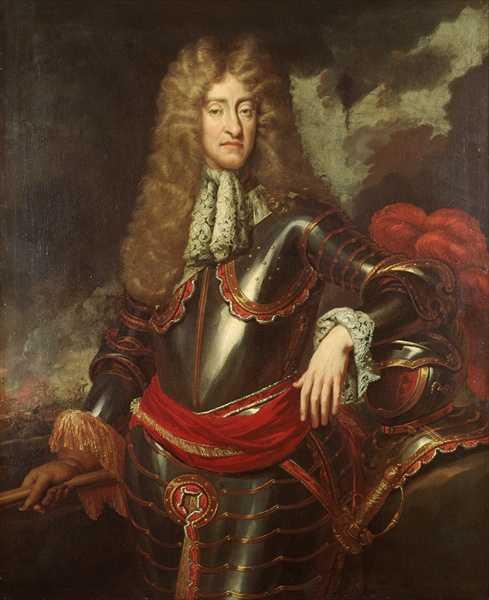
King James II, who approved of the Charter of 1662.

In one sense, the Fundamental Orders were replaced by a Royal Charter in 1662 with approval from King Charles II, mainly because the Orders didn’t have a firm legal basis to be considered an official document, as well as not mentioning the crown or British at all. However, the major outline of the charter was written in Connecticut and embodied the Orders' rights and mechanics. The colonists generally viewed the charter as a continuation and surety for their Fundamental Orders. Later on, the Charter Oak got its name when that charter was taken from Jeremy Adams's tavern and supposedly hidden in an oak tree, rather than it be surrendered to the agents of James II, who intended to annex Connecticut to the more centralized Dominion of New England.

== Government Structure ==
The structure of Colonial Connecticut could be considered a republic. The government contained three separate parts, known as the electorates, officers and general court. Those in government positions, like the governor (electorate branch), were elected through a ballot system. What is unique was that there were no property, tax or military requirements, thus there was an expanded number of those who were allowed to vote, unlike other constitutions at the time. It is also notable for having said common folk be able to vote and run for positions in the government as well. Because of this, any changes to the structure of government was unnecessary, even during the transition from the Orders to the Charter and even during the Revolution when other colonies were changing their constitutions. Implementations were also made for government reorganization, if the current magistrates interfered with the rights given by the Orders.

While borrowing some elements of structure from the Massachusetts Bay Colony, such as having the inhabitants vote for deputies and not relegating the vote to church members only, the colony would still try to differentiate itself from its mother colony as a form of protest. It also provides that all free men share in electing their magistrates, and uses secret, paper ballots and states the powers of the government and some limits within which that power is exercised.

== Individual Rights of People ==
When discussing the Fundamental Orders today, the individual rights in the Orders, with others added over the years, are still included as a "Declaration of Rights" in the first article of the current Connecticut Constitution, adopted in 1965. As mentioned previously, the right to vote wasn’t restricted by any detrimental requirements and positions of power weren’t limited to the gentry. Colonial Connecticut’s government was mainly a creation of the people and without any form of sovereignty controlling the area, government would be catered towards the needs of the people. Positions of power also had limits, with the governor or legislature, not having control over any precedents made on a local level of government, like monetary or local laws. It is also notable for being one of the first documents to have a clause about “taxation without representation”.

However, there were limitations to how democratic the Orders could be. Those who lived in the colony were either designated as “inhabitants” or “freemen”. The common folk were usually labeled as inhabitants were able to vote during town meetings and hold town office positions, they were unable to vote for higher positions of power, like governor. Those who could, the freemen, were only given the title by the General Court or magistrates, thus most of the freemen the people of the company, but of corporations, a problem which occurred under the 1662 Charter.

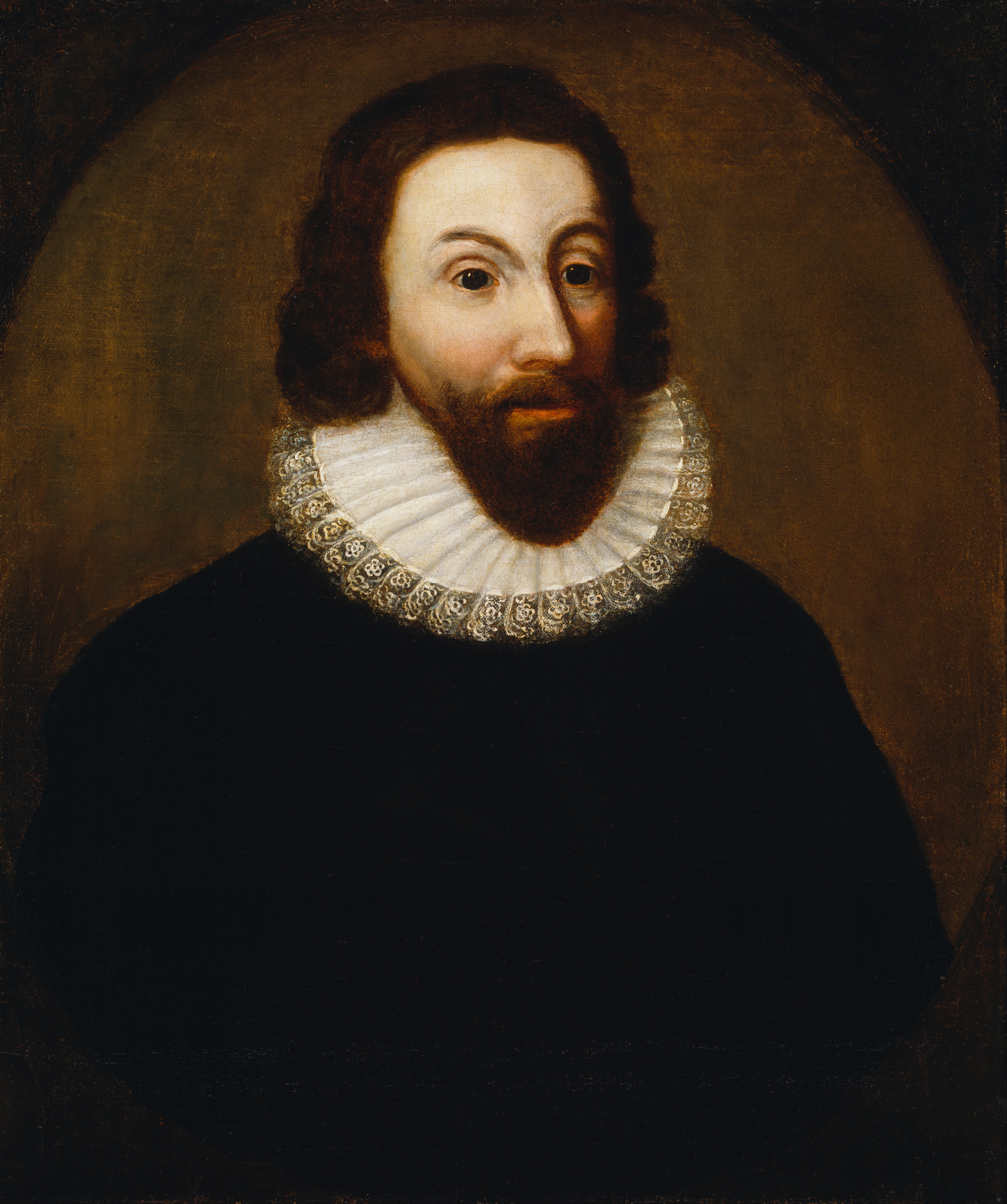
John Winthrop, the Connecticut governor who ran for multiple terms.

Additionally, it was still based on Puritan fundamentals and ruled based on their interpretation of God, meaning actions such as profanity or adultery could result in punishment. It contained an oath of fidelity, which would have excluded individuals who were not Puritan from voting or running for office, granted there would not have been these individuals living in Connecticut at the time. Governor John Winthrop was also elected on multiple occasions, due to his popularity, despite the articles stating Governors could only run for one term.

== Competing claims for the first Western constitution ==
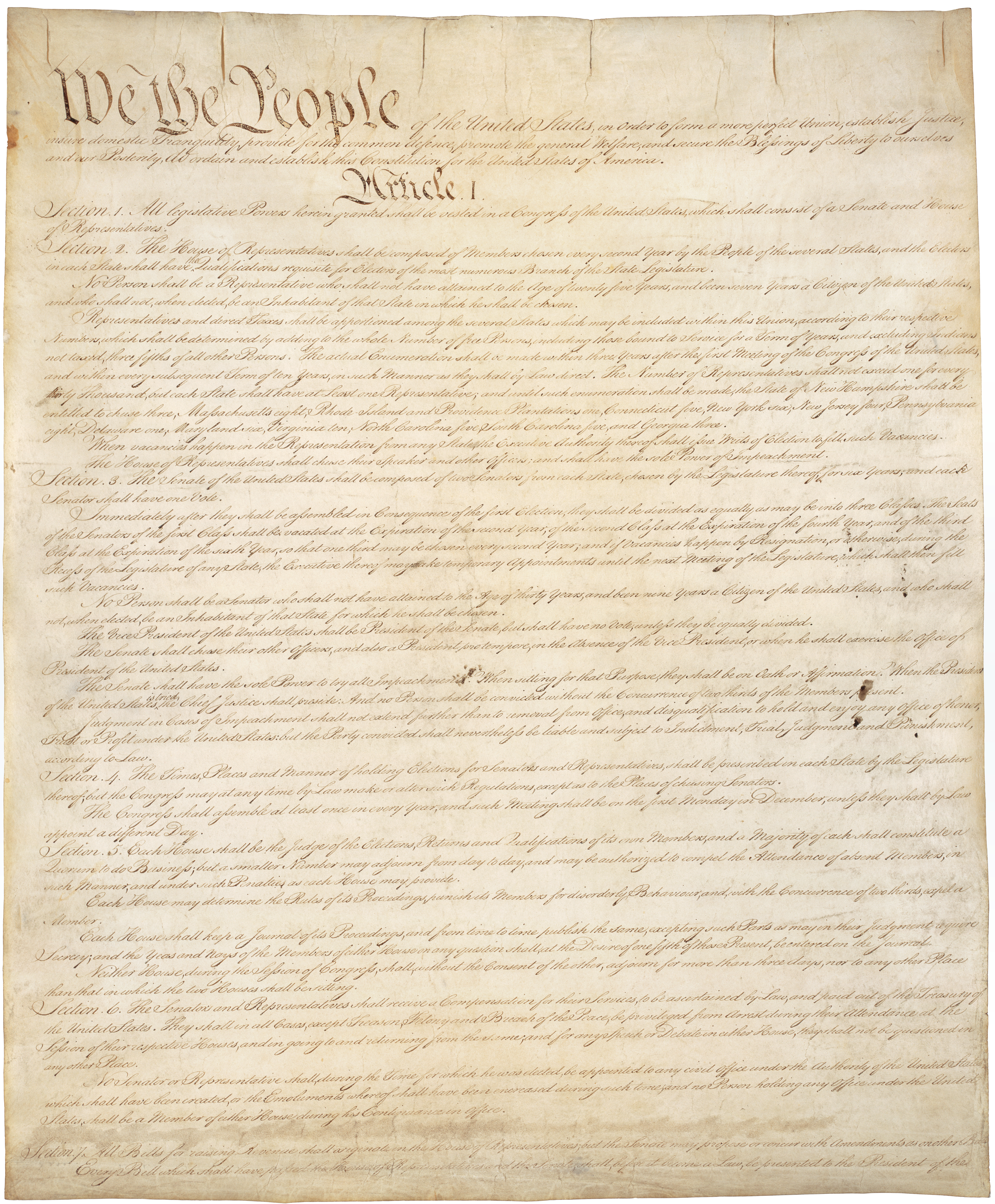
The Constitution of the United States, often said to have been inspired by the Fundamental Orders

Connecticut historian John Fiske was the first to claim that the Fundamental Orders were the first written Constitution, a claim disputed by some modern historians. The Mayflower Compact has an equal claim 19 years before; however, the Orders gave men more voting rights and made more men eligible to run for elected positions.

Karolina Adamová, a scientific member of the Institute of State and Law of the Czech Academy of Sciences argues that the articles of the Bohemian Confederacy adopted by the General Assembly of the evangelical estates in Prague on July 31, 1619, can be considered to be both the first modern written constitution and the first federal constitution in recorded history.
