= Gleneagles Dialogue =

The Gleneagles Dialog is a summit (meeting) of the environment and energy ministers from the G8 countries Canada, France, Germany, Italy, Japan, Russia, United Kingdom, and the United States, as well as from Australia, Brazil, China, India, Indonesia, Mexico, Nigeria, Poland, South Africa, South Korea, Spain, and the European Union.
