= How Global Warming Works =

Global warming website

- Website type: Educational
- Owners: Michael Andrew Ranney (University of California, Berkeley) and The Regents of the University of California
- Website: www.howglobalwarmingworks.org
- Commercial: No
- Registration: Not required
- Launched: 2013

How Global Warming Works is a website developed by Michael Ranney, a professor of cognitive psychology at the University of California, Berkeley in Berkeley, California, United States. The stated goal of the website is to educate the public on the mechanisms of global warming, which was motivated by research Ranney and colleagues conducted on attitudes towards and understanding of global warming.

== Background ==
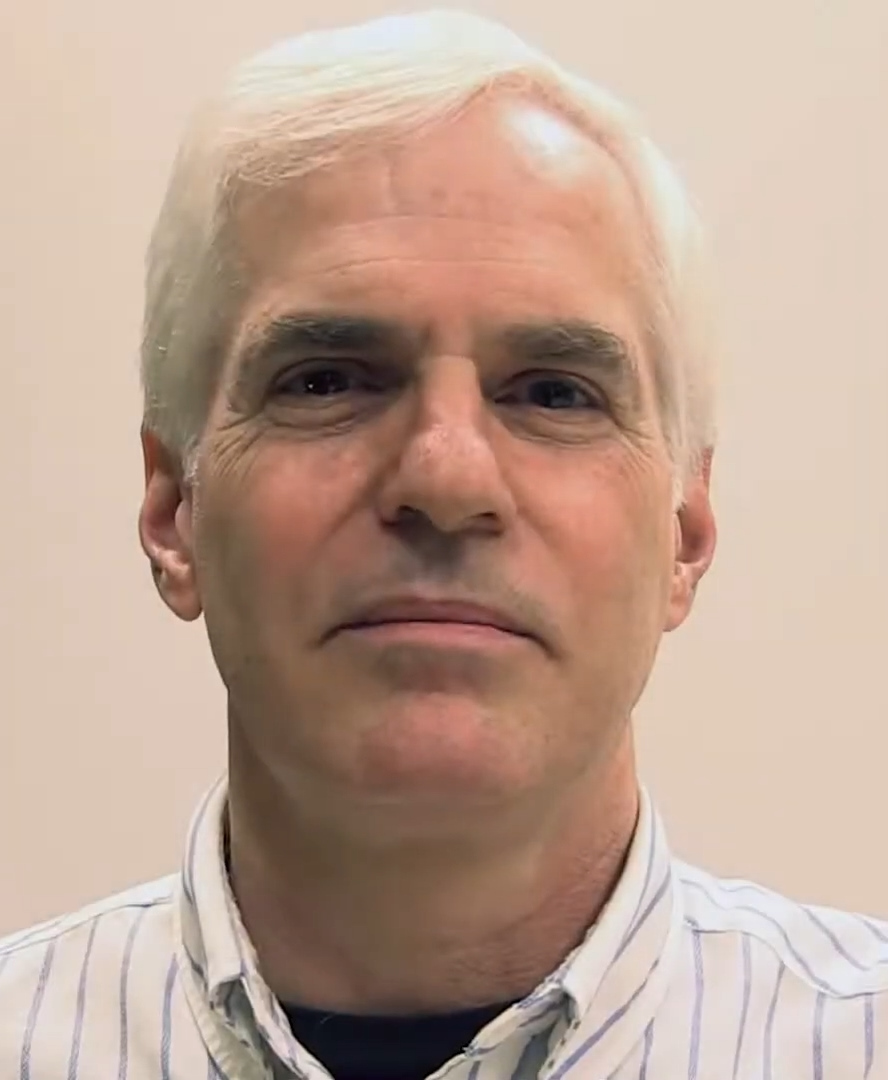
Michael Ranney in 2015

The motivation for the website came from two studies conducted by Ranney and colleagues. In the first study, they hypothesized that one of the factors explaining why fewer Americans believe in global warming than do people in other industrialized nations is that they do not understand the mechanism of global warming. To test this hypothesis, they anonymously surveyed 270 park visitors and community college students in San Diego. They reported that none of the 270 participants could explain the basic mechanism of global warming even though 80% thought that global warming was real and that 77% thought that humans contributed to it.

In the second study, they hypothesized that if people understood the mechanism of global warming, their understanding and acceptance of it would increase. Using a 400-word explanation of global warming they tested their hypothesis on students from the University of California, Berkeley and from the University of Texas at Brownsville.

The following summary of the explanation given to the students to read was provided in Scientific American:

Summary: (a) Earth absorbs most of the sunlight it receives; (b) Earth then emits the absorbed light's energy as infrared light; (c) greenhouse gases absorb a lot of the infrared light before it can leave our atmosphere; (d) being absorbed slows the rate at which energy escapes to space; and (e) the slower passage of energy heats up the atmosphere, water, and ground. By increasing the amount of greenhouse gases in the atmosphere, humans are increasing the atmosphere’s absorption of infrared light, thereby warming Earth and disrupting global climate patterns.

They reported that by reading a brief description of the mechanism of global warming, participants in the study increased both their understanding and acceptance of global warming. These results, which have been repeatedly replicated, motivated them to launch a new website with the aim of providing website visitors with videos of the mechanisms of global warming so that they could educate themselves on how global warming works.

== Website ==
The website provides videos ranging from 52 seconds to under 5 minutes that describe and illustrate the mechanisms of global warming. It also provides seven statistics that have been shown by Ranney and Clark to increase global warming acceptance. Further, the website's videos have been translated into Mandarin and German , and transcripts of the videos in several other languages are available. Texts explaining global warming's mechanism are also available. Some of the site's information has been translated into Mandarin, and the Mandarin videos are available on Youku.

== Analysis ==
In 2014 Dan Kahan was skeptical about Ranney's approach and this website's large-scale effectiveness in educating people about global warming, telling Nova, "I don't think it makes sense to believe that if you tell people in five-minute lectures about climate science, that it's going to solve the problem". However, Ranney and his colleagues have been assessing the videos in randomized controlled experiments and indicate that the videos (including a four-minute German video), like the 400-word mechanistic text, increase viewers' global warming acceptance—as do the aforementioned representative statistics. In addition, the website contrasts the change in Earth's temperature since 1880 with the change in the value of the Dow Jones Industrial Average (adjusted for inflation); this contrast also increases readers' global warming acceptance.

== See also ==
- Public opinion on climate change
- Global warming controversy
