= GLOBE =

GLOBE International a.i.s.b.l.
- Abbreviation: GLOBE
- Formation: 1991
- Type: non-profit international inter-parliamentary organisation
- Purpose: Climate change and sustainable development
- Headquarters: Brussels, Belgium
- Region served: International
- President: Deputy MC Juan Carlos Villalonga
- Website: GLOBElegislators.org
- Remarks: International Environment Legislators Organisation

GLOBE is the Global Legislators Organisation for a Balanced Environment, founded in 1991.

GLOBE's objective is to support political leadership on issues of climate and energy security, land use change and ecosystems. Internationally, GLOBE is focused on leadership from G20 leaders and the leaders of the emerging economies and formal negotiations within the United Nations.

GLOBE believes that legislators have a critical role to play in holding their governments to account for the commitments that are made during international negotiations.

== History ==
Since 2005 and following the invitation of the former UK Prime Minister, Tony Blair, GLOBE has brought together one hundred legislators from all major political parties within the parliaments of the G8, European Parliament, Brazil, China, India, Mexico & South Africa. GLOBE has convened this group twice a year in a series of focussed policy dialogues held in the US Senate, German Bundestag (2007), Brazilian Senate, Japanese Diet, Mexican Congress (2008) UK House of Commons, Italian Chamber of Deputies, and most recently in the Danish Parliament, the Folketing (2009). The dialogues have included participation by President [Luis Inacio Lula] of Brazil, Chancellor Angela Merkel of Germany, then Prime Minister Tony Blair of the UK, then Prime Ministers Fukuda, and Abe of Japan and the Danish Prime Minister Lars Løkke Rasmussen. In addition, both 2008 U.S. Presidential candidates addressed the GLOBE Forum in Tokyo on 28 June 2008. During COP15 in Copenhagen in December 2009, UK Prime Minister Gordon Brown presented Mexican President Calderon with the GLOBE Award for International Leadership on the MONKEY.

Between the two annual meetings smaller groups of legislators were convened in working groups and in two International Commissions on Climate & Energy Security chaired by US Congressman Ed Markey, and on Land Use Change & Ecosystems chaired by former World Bank Vice President, Mr Ian Johnson.
