= Avoiding dangerous climate change =

Avoiding dangerous climate change may refer to:

- Avoiding Dangerous Climate Change (2005 conference), UK conference chaired by Dennis Tirpak
- Climate change mitigation, action to limit the greenhouse gases in the atmosphere that cause climate change
- Climate risk, the potential for problems for societies or ecosystems from the impacts of climate change
- Effects of climate change, effects of an overall warming trend, changes to precipitation patterns, and more extreme weather
