= Avoiding Dangerous Climate Change (2005 conference) =

2005 conference on its consequences

Conference logo

In 2005, an international conference titled Avoiding Dangerous Climate Change: A Scientific Symposium on Stabilisation of Greenhouse Gases examined the link between atmospheric greenhouse gas concentration and global warming and its effects. The conference name was derived from Article 2 of the charter for the United Nations Framework Convention on Climate Change. The conference explored the possible impacts at different levels of greenhouse gas emissions and how the climate might be stabilized at a desired level. The conference took place under the United Kingdom's presidency of the G8, with the participation of around 200 "internationally renowned" scientists from 30 countries. It was chaired by Dennis Tirpak and hosted by the Hadley Centre for Climate Prediction and Research in Exeter, from 1 February to 3 February.

The conference was one of many meetings leading up to the 2015 Paris Agreement, at which the international community agreed to limit global warming to no more than 2 °C in order to have a 50-50 chance of avoiding dangerous climate change.

== Objectives ==
Global carbon dioxide emissions through year 2004

Global average surface temperature 1880 to 2015, with a zero variance point set at the average temperature between 1961 and 1990

The conference was called to bring together the latest research into what would be necessary to achieve the objective of the 1992 United Nations Framework Convention on Climate Change:

to achieve, in accordance with the relevant provisions of the Convention, stabilization of greenhouse gas concentrations in the atmosphere at a level that would prevent dangerous anthropogenic interference with the climate system.

It was also intended to encourage further research in the area. In the 2001 IPCC Third Assessment Report, an initial assessment of the subject had been included; however, the topic had received relatively little international discussion.

Specifically, the conference explored three issues:

- For different levels of climate change what are the key impacts, for different regions and sectors and for the world as a whole?
- What would such levels of climate change imply in terms of greenhouse gas stabilisation concentrations and emission pathways required to achieve such levels?
- What options are there for achieving stabilisation of greenhouse gases at different stabilisation concentrations in the atmosphere, taking into account costs and uncertainties?

== Conclusions ==
Among the conclusions reached, the most significant was a new assessment of the link between the concentration of greenhouse gases in the atmosphere and the increase in global temperature levels. Some researchers have argued that the most serious consequences of global warming might be avoided if global average temperatures rose by no more than 2 °C (3.6 °F) above pre-industrial levels. It had generally been assumed that this would occur if greenhouse gas concentrations rose above 550 ppm carbon dioxide equivalent by volume. This concentration was, for example, informing government in certain countries, including the European Union.

The conference concluded that, at the level of 550 ppm, it was likely that 2 °C would be exceeded, according to the projections of more recent climate models. Stabilising greenhouse gas concentrations at 450 ppm would only result in a 50% likelihood of limiting global warming to 2 °C, and that it would be necessary to achieve stabilisation below 400 ppm to give a relatively high certainty of not exceeding 2 °C.

The conference also claimed that, if action to reduce emissions is delayed by 20 years, rates of emission reduction may need to be 3 to 7 times greater to meet the same temperature target.

== Reaction ==
As a result of changing opinion on the 'safe' atmospheric concentration of greenhouse gases, to which this conference contributed, the UK government changed the target in the Climate Change Act from 60% to 80% by 2050.

== See also ==
- 4 Degrees and Beyond International Climate Conference
- Action on climate change
- Climate change mitigation scenarios
- Environmental impact of aviation
- Hypermobility (travel)
- Index of climate change articles
