= Molecular-scale temperature =

The molecular-scale temperature is the defining property of the U.S. Standard Atmosphere, 1962. It is defined by the relationship:

$$T_m(z)=\frac{M_0}{M(z)}\cdot{T(z)}$$

T_{m}(z) is molecular-scale temperature at altitude z;
M_{0} is molecular weight of air at sea level;
M(z) is molecular weight of air at altitude z;
T(z) is absolute temperature at altitude z.

This is citation of the Technical Report of USAF from 1967.
