= Constitution of Connecticut =

American state constitution

Constitution of the State of Connecticut

Overview
- Jurisdiction: Connecticut, United States
- Ratified: December 14, 1965; 60 years ago
- Date effective: December 30, 1965; 60 years ago
- Chambers: Two (bicameral Connecticut General Assembly)
- Executive: Governor of Connecticut
- Judiciary: Judiciary of Connecticut

History
- Amendments: 31

The Constitution of the State of Connecticut is the basic governing document of the U.S. state of Connecticut. It was approved by referendum on December 14, 1965, and proclaimed by the governor as adopted on December 30. It comprises 14 articles and has been amended 31 times.

This constitution replaced the earlier constitution of 1818. It is the state's second constitution since the establishment of the United States. An earlier constitution dating from colonial times, the Fundamental Orders of Connecticut, remained the basis of government even as Connecticut gained its independence from Great Britain, existed as an independent polity, and joined the United States.

== Articles ==
The constitution consists of fourteen articles:

1. Declaration of Rights – Analogous to the United States Bill of Rights, providing rights to speech, assembly, speedy trial, bearing of arms, and religion, among others.
2. Of the Distribution of Powers – Establishes three branches of government in the state: legislative, executive, and judicial.
3. Of the Legislative Department – Creates a two-house legislature, sets standards for districting, elections, and ethics.
4. Of the Executive Department – Sets terms, requirements, and powers of the governor, lieutenant governor, secretary of the state, treasurer and comptroller.
5. Of the Judicial Department – Establishes supreme, superior, and lesser courts, and the rules that govern how judges are chosen.
6. Of the Qualifications of Electors – Lists age and residency requirements for voters.
7. Of Religion – Reiterates the right to free practice of religion.
8. Of Education – Charters a free elementary school school system, the University of Connecticut, and Yale College.
9. Of Impeachments – Sets rules for impeachment and treason trials.
10. Of Home Rule – Gives the general assembly the right to delegate authority to cities and towns.
11. General Provisions – The oath of office, restrictions on salary raises, and other miscellaneous rules.
12. Of Amendments to the Constitution – Establishes the method of amending the state constitution.
13. Of Constitutional Conventions – Creates the method of calling for a special convention to amend or revise the constitution.
14. Of the Effective Date of This Constitution – The constitution became effective after approval by a popular vote and proclamation by the governor.

== Amending the constitution ==
Legislature and referendum

The Connecticut constitution can be amended via a process that originates in the General Assembly. If a joint resolution proposing a constitutional amendment passes each house of the General Assembly with a three-fourths majority of the votes cast, the amendment is submitted to the voters in the next even-numbered year's general election. If such a joint resolution fails to win a three-fourths majority vote in either house but still obtains a majority, it must receive a majority in each house during the next legislative session before being submitted to the voters in the next even-numbered year's general election. An amendment that wins a majority of the votes cast in the referendum is adopted.

Constitutional convention

A constitutional convention can amend the constitution. Such a convention is called either:

- when called for by a two-thirds vote of each house of the General Assembly, provided at least 10 years have passed since a constitutional convention was convened; or
- when approved by a majority vote of the electorate, to whom the question "Shall there be a Constitutional Convention to amend or revise the Constitution of the State?" is submitted whenever 20 years have passed since a constitutional convention was convened and since the question of calling a convention was submitted to the voters.

The General Assembly shall decide, by a two-thirds vote of each house, the method for selecting convention delegates and the date of the convention's convening and adjournment. The most recent referendum on calling a constitutional convention was held on November 4, 2008. Voters opposed calling a constitutional convention by a vote of 847,518 to 579,904.

== List of amendments ==
The state constitution has been amended 31 times.

1. November 25, 1970 – Added the office of Attorney General to the list of state officers.
2. November 25, 1970 – Changed the minimum age for state elected offices to 21, except in cases provided for in the constitution.
3. November 25, 1970 – Created a requirement for annual – not biennial – general sessions of the legislature.
4. December 22, 1972 – Established a six-person jury for criminal trials (twelve for capital offenses), and the right of peremptory challenge.
5. November 27, 1974 – Prohibition on sexual discrimination.
6. November 27, 1974 – Minor changes to the wording of the article defining the Amendment process.
7. November 27, 1974 – Revised electorship to be a "right," not a "privilege."
8. November 27, 1974 – Removed the position of Justice of the Peace.
9. November 24, 1976 – Reduced the age requirement for an elector from 21 to 18, and relaxed the residency and reading requirements.
10. November 24, 1976 – Allowed 17-year-olds to become electors if their eighteenth birthday will be before the election.
11. November 24, 1976 – Gave the supreme court the right to remove or suspend a judge, and provides a legislative judicial review council.
12. November 24, 1976 – Established procedures for redistricting.
13. November 26, 1980 – Removed a paperwork requirement for general assembly elections.
14. November 26, 1980 – Made the elector application details a matter of law.
15. November 26, 1980 – Changed the minimum age for state elected offices to 18, except in cases provided for in the constitution.
16. November 26, 1980 – Revised procedures for redistricting (gave the state legislature 3 more months to submit a plan before the governor was required to appoint a commission).
17. November 24, 1982 – "In all criminal prosecutions, the accused shall have a right to be heard by himself and by counsel; to be informed of the nature and cause of the accusation; to be confronted by the witnesses against him; to have compulsory process to obtain witnesses in his behalf; to be released on bail upon sufficient security, except in capital offenses, where the proof is evident or the presumption great; and in all prosecutions by information, to a speedy, public trial by an impartial jury. No person shall be compelled to give evidence against himself, nor be deprived of life, liberty or property without due process of law, nor shall excessive bail be required nor excessive fines imposed. No person shall be held to answer for any crime, punishable by death or life imprisonment, unless upon probable cause shown at a hearing in accordance with procedures prescribed by law, except in the armed forces, or in the militia when in actual service in time of war or public danger."
18. November 24, 1982 – Amends Article II of the constitution to divide the powers of the government into three distinct departments, and each of them confided to a separate magistracy: the legislative, the executive and the judicial. The legislative department may delegate regulatory authority to the executive department; except that any administrative regulation of any agency of the executive department may be disapproved by the general assembly or a committee thereof in such manner as shall by law be prescribed.
19. November 24, 1982 – Amends Section 2 of Article XI to prohibit, except as provided in the amendment, pay increases to elected officials of the state or any subdivision thereof in excess of the amount of compensation entitled to at the time of taking office.
20. November 24, 1982 – Amends Article V to create an appellate court.
21. November 28, 1984 – Amends Article V of the Amendments to the Constitution of the state to prohibit discrimination on account of physical or mental disability.
22. November 28, 1984 – Amends Section 18 of Article IV with respect to gubernatorial succession and when the lieutenant governor shall act as governor.
23. November 28, 1984 – Amends Article IV by adding a new section to establish a division of criminal justice and vest state prosecutorial power in a chief state's attorney and the state attorney in each judicial district.
24. November 19, 1986 – Amends Section 5 of Article VI to prohibit voting by means of a straight-ticket device.
25. November 19, 1986 – Amends Section 2 of Article XX of the Amendments to the Constitution of the state with respect to selection, nomination, appointment, and removal of judges.
26. November 28, 1990 – Amends Section 2 of Article XVI of the Amendments of the Constitution of the state with respect to redistricting.
27. November 25, 1992 – Amends Section 8 of Article VI to allow "The general assembly [to] provide by law for the absentee admission of electors."
28. November 25, 1992 – Amends Article III by adding a section establishing a spending cap and its terms of execution.
29. November 27, 1996 – Amends Article XVII of the Amendments of the Constitution of the state with respect to the rights of the accused and the rights of crime victims.
30. November 29, 2000 – Repeals Section 25 of Article IV of the Constitution, eliminating the county sheriffs.
31. November 26, 2008 – Granted pre-registered electors who have not yet attained 18 years of age the right to vote in primary elections, so long as they will have attained the age of 18 years on or before the date of its respective general election.
32. November 28, 2018 – Amends Article III of the Constitution by adding a section which sets down regulations regarding funding for, use of, and status for the state's Special Transportation Fund, establishing it as a perpetual fund, funded by state law, for transportation purposes only.
33. November 28, 2018 – Amends Article III of the Constitution by adding a section which forbids the Legislature from selling, transferring, or otherwise disposing of state-owed real property or interest in real property, except after a public hearing held by a committee of the Legislature, and in the case of property owned by the Department of Agriculture or Department of Energy and Environmental Protection, after a two-thirds majority vote in both houses of the Legislature.
34. November 30, 2022 – Amends Section 7 of Article VI, Section 9 of Article III, and Section 4 of Article IV of the Constitution to permit the State Assembly to allow for a period of early voting before Election Day.

== Earlier Connecticut constitutions ==
The Fundamental Orders of Connecticut (1638) is considered by many to be the state's first constitution, although it was adopted while the state was still an English colony. The document recognized no allegiance to England but instead an independent government. The Charter of the Colony of Connecticut (1662) officially superseded the Fundamental Orders, but the local government continued operating under the previous rules. Even after the American Revolutionary War, the state retained its constitution for another 40 years.

The colonial charter was abolished with the adoption of the first state constitution in 1818. In contrast to the Fundamental Orders, that constitution provided for freedom of religion.

On October 1, 1901, Connecticut residents voted nearly 2-to-1 in favor of calling of a constitutional convention to revise the constitution. A convention was held, and a revised constitution was proposed. On June 16, 1902, voters rejected the revised constitution by a margin of more than 2-to-1.
