= Glacial geoengineering =

Proposed climate interventions to slow glacier and ice sheet loss

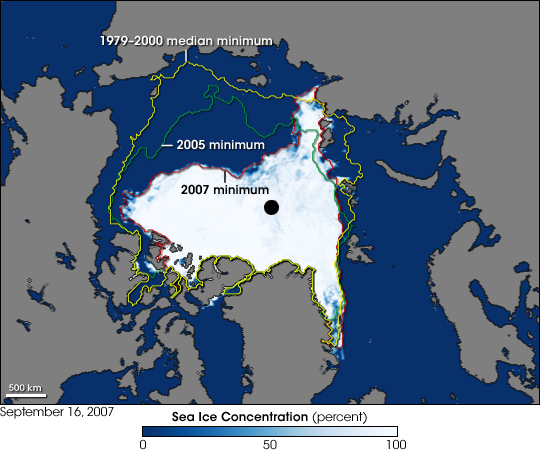
Arctic sea ice coverage as of 2007 compared to 2005 and also compared to 1979-2000 average

Glacial geoengineering is a set of proposed geoengineering approaches that focus on slowing the loss of glaciers, ice sheets, and sea ice in polar regions and, in some cases, alpine areas. Proposals are motivated by concerns that feedback loops—such as ice-albedo loss, accelerated glacier flow, and permafrost methane release—could amplify climate change and trigger climate tipping points.

Proposed glacial geoengineering methods include regional or local solar radiation management, thinning cirrus clouds to allow more heat to escape, and deploying mechanical or engineering structures to stabilize ice. Specific strategies under investigation are stratospheric aerosol injection focused on polar regions, marine cloud brightening, surface albedo modification with reflective materials, basal interventions such as draining subglacial water or promoting basal freezing, and ice shelf protection measures including seabed curtains.

Glacial geoengineering is in the early research stage and many proposals face major technical, environmental, and governance challenges. Supporters argue that targeted interventions could help stabilize ice sheets, slow sea-level rise, and reduce the risk of passing irreversible thresholds in the climate system. At the same time, experts caution that the effectiveness of these methods remains highly uncertain and that interventions could produce unintended side effects. Glacial geoengineering is generally considered a possible complement to, not a replacement for, efforts to reduce greenhouse gas emissions.

== Background ==
The rapid decline of Arctic sea ice has drawn attention to feedback loops that could accelerate global warming and has motivated proposals for climate intervention.

The Arctic's albedo plays a major role in regulating how much solar radiation is reflected away from Earth's surface. As sea ice melts and the region's albedo decreases, less sunlight is reflected, causing additional warming. This creates a positive feedback loop, known as the ice-albedo feedback loop, where rising temperatures cause further ice loss. If this process continues, it could push the climate system past critical tipping points.

Melting Arctic ice may also release methane, a powerful greenhouse gas stored in permafrost as methane clathrate. Methane release could drive additional warming, creating another feedback loop. A 3 °C rise above pre-industrial temperatures could thaw 30–85% of Arctic permafrost, risking major climate impacts. The IPCC Sixth Assessment Report projected that Arctic late-summer sea ice could largely disappear by the mid 21st century. In response, glacial engineering has been proposed to slow or reverse these trends.mid

Supporters of Arctic geoengineering argue it could stabilize permafrost carbon stores and limit further warming. Arctic permafrost holds an estimated 1,700 billion metric tons of carbon—about 51 times the amount of annual global fossil fuel emissions. Permafrost soils across the Northern Hemisphere contain about twice as much carbon as the atmosphere, and Arctic air temperatures have risen roughly six times faster than the global average. Continued ice loss could substantially accelerate global warming. Arctic sea ice also helps regulate global temperatures by limiting the release of strong greenhouse gases.

Proposed geoengineering strategies aim to protect existing sea ice and encourage new ice growth. Methods include reducing sunlight reaching the surface, promoting freezing, and slowing melt rates. Approaches include stratospheric sulfate aerosol injection, pumping seawater onto ice to thicken it, and covering ice with hollow glass spheres to enhance reflectivity. These methods vary widely in cost, complexity, and technical feasibility.

== Mechanical and engineering methods ==
=== Surface ice thickening ===
Surface ice thickening is a proposed glacial geoengineering strategy aimed at slowing ice loss by building up the thickness of glaciers, ice sheets, or sea ice. One method involves pumping seawater onto the surface of polar ice sheets during winter, allowing it to freeze and add mass. Thickening the ice in this way could make it more resistant to melting and flow. The Centre for Climate Repair at Cambridge has proposed a concept where fleets of wind- and solar-powered pumps would distribute seawater across vulnerable areas to help stabilize ice sheets, while the RealIce project has explored similar techniques using energy-efficient pumping technologies.

Another approach focuses on increasing snowfall. Artificial snow production, a technology already common at ski resorts, could be adapted to add mass to glaciers and ice sheets. By spraying fine droplets of water into cold air, snow can be generated and deposited on the surface. This method is not without costs though, a large amount of energy and water is required--over 20,000 kWh of energy and 3,000 cubic meters per hectare of snow coverage. Research initiatives have investigated the potential of artificial snowmaking for glacier protection, particularly in alpine regions. Artificial snow making brings up another environmental issue though--water use.

Surface thickening methods could be deployed either over large sections of polar ice sheets or in more targeted ways, such as reinforcing weak spots near glacier grounding lines. However, scaling these interventions across vast polar areas would require large infrastructure investments and could present environmental challenges.

=== Basal interventions ===
Basal interventions aim to slow the flow of glaciers and ice sheets by modifying conditions at their base. One proposed method is draining meltwater from beneath glaciers to reduce lubrication at the ice-bed interface. Removing this water could increase friction between the ice and bedrock, slowing glacial movement and reducing the contribution to sea-level rise.

Another approach involves basal freezing, where artificial cooling is used to promote the refreezing of water at the base of the ice sheet. This could increase the strength of the ice-bed connection and further stabilize glacier flow. Techniques under consideration include installing thermal systems to extract heat from the bed or injecting cooled fluids to promote freezing.

Basal interventions could target key outlet glaciers or grounding lines where destabilization is occurring most rapidly. Modeling studies suggest that these methods could be effective in slowing ice sheet collapse, but the technical challenges are significant. Drilling, installing, and maintaining systems under thick ice in remote, harsh environments would require major engineering efforts.

=== Ice shelf protection ===
Protecting ice shelves is an important focus of glacial geoengineering proposals, as ice shelves play a key role in slowing the flow of glaciers into the ocean. Several strategies have been proposed to stabilize ice shelves and reduce the risk of rapid ice loss.

One approach involves buttressing ice shelves by constructing artificial anchors or adding material to strengthen existing grounding points. This could include placing rocks or engineered structures on the seabed where ice shelves are weak, helping to pin the ice and slow its flow (; https://climateinterventions.org/interventions/ice-sheet-stabilization-via-buttressing/). Studies suggest that even small changes in buttressing could have large effects on the stability of upstream glaciers.

Another proposal is to install seabed curtains or barriers to block the flow of warm ocean water toward glacier grounding lines. These flexible underwater structures would be anchored to the seabed and extend vertically to impede warm currents, which currently erode the ice from below. The Centre for Climate Repair at Cambridge has highlighted seabed curtains as a potentially scalable method to slow ice shelf thinning and collapse. Research and engineering studies have explored designs for curtains that could withstand ocean currents while remaining flexible enough to adjust to ice movements.

While modeling studies suggest that both buttressing and seabed barriers could meaningfully slow ice loss, these approaches would involve major engineering challenges. Building and maintaining structures in remote, dynamic polar environments would be technically complex and costly. Potential environmental impacts, such as changes to ocean circulation or ecosystems, would also need to be carefully considered.

== Solar radiation modifications (SRM) methods ==
Solar radiation modification (SRM), also called solar geoengineering, is a group of large-scale approaches to reduce global warming by increasing the amount of sunlight that is reflected away from Earth and back to outer space. It is not intended to replace efforts to reduce greenhouse gas emissions, but rather to complement them as a potential way to limit global warming. SRM is a form of geoengineering.

=== Stratospheric aerosol injection ===
Stratospheric aerosol injection (SAI) concentrated in polar regions is a proposed geoengineering method to slow the melting of polar ice. It involves releasing small reflective particles, such as sulfur dioxide, into the stratosphere over high latitudes to reflect sunlight and cool the surface below. Targeting aerosols in the Arctic and Antarctic could reduce polar amplification—the faster warming of the poles compared to the rest of the planet—and help preserve sea ice and glaciers. Climate model studies suggest that polar-focused SAI could reduce summer ice loss, limit sea-level rise, and have fewer global side effects than a uniform worldwide aerosol distribution .

One proposed strategy is to release aerosols seasonally during the polar winter, when solar energy is returning but atmospheric conditions are more stable. This could maximize cooling effects while minimizing disruption to atmospheric circulation. However, even polar SAI could alter weather patterns, weaken the polar vortex, and affect ozone chemistry. While SAI shows potential to slow polar ice loss, uncertainties remain about its effectiveness, regional impacts, and governance challenges.

=== Marine cloud brightening ===
Marine cloud brightening (MCB) is a proposed geoengineering method that would involve spraying fine seawater droplets into the atmosphere to make clouds more reflective, thereby cooling the surface below. In polar regions, MCB aims to increase the brightness of low-lying clouds over the oceans to reduce regional warming and slow ice loss. Research suggests that targeting MCB at high latitudes could help stabilize Arctic sea ice, with fewer global side effects compared to interventions applied worldwide. Observational studies in the Southern Ocean, where natural cloud brightening occurs, provide supporting evidence that increasing cloud droplet concentration can significantly boost cloud reflectivity and cooling potential.

The Centre for Climate Repair at Cambridge has proposed developing MCB techniques specifically to "refreeze" the Arctic by restoring the reflectivity of polar clouds. Other proposals suggest using fleets of unmanned vessels to continuously spray seawater into the atmosphere over targeted ocean areas. Although polar MCB shows promise in models, technical challenges, potential ecological impacts, and the difficulty of achieving sufficient cloud modification at large scales remain significant obstacles.

=== Ocean albedo modification ===
Ocean albedo modification would aim to make open ocean surfaces near the poles more reflective, reducing the amount of solar energy absorbed by the water. One idea is to generate microbubbles or apply reflective foams across the ocean surface to increase its brightness. Studies suggest that even modest increases in surface reflectivity could contribute to localized cooling and help slow the loss of sea ice. Proposed techniques include releasing air bubbles from ships or using surface treatments to create a whiter ocean surface . However, large-scale deployment of these methods remains theoretical. Challenges include maintaining a sufficient concentration of bubbles or foam over time, potential impacts on marine ecosystems, and the difficulty of covering large ocean areas in a sustainable way.

=== Surface albedo modification ===
Surface albedo modification is a proposed geoengineering method aimed at slowing ice melt by increasing the reflectivity of glaciers, ice sheets, and sea ice. Techniques under study include applying bright materials, such as hollow glass microspheres or reflective geotextiles, to ice surfaces. By increasing albedo, these treatments are intended to reflect more solar radiation and reduce surface warming. Field experiments have demonstrated that surface treatments can raise local albedo and delay melting under controlled conditions. Scaling such methods to cover the extensive areas of polar ice necessary to significantly impact global sea-level rise presents major technical and logistical challenges.

The organization Ice911 Research, later renamed the Arctic Ice Project, conducted field tests using hollow glass microspheres to increase the reflectivity of sea ice. Although small-scale trials indicated some increase in ice surface albedo, questions about environmental impacts, material durability, and deployment feasibility remained. The Arctic Ice Project ended operations in 2024.

Surface albedo modification has also been tested on alpine glaciers. Projects in Switzerland, Austria, and elsewhere have deployed geotextile blankets over glacier surfaces to reflect sunlight and reduce seasonal melt. Unlike polar-scale proposals, alpine applications are generally focused on preserving ice for tourism, water supply, and local ecosystems rather than influencing global climate.

=== Cirrus cloud thinning ===
Cirrus cloud thinning (CCT) is a proposed geoengineering method designed to reduce the warming effect of high-altitude cirrus clouds by making them thinner and shorter-lived. Unlike low clouds, which reflect sunlight and cool the surface, cirrus clouds trap outgoing infrared radiation and contribute to warming. In polar regions, especially during winter when sunlight is minimal, thinning cirrus clouds could enhance longwave radiation loss to space and promote regional cooling. Proposed techniques involve injecting ice-nucleating particles into the upper troposphere to encourage the growth of larger ice crystals, which fall out more rapidly, reducing cloud thickness and lifetime.

Modeling studies suggest that cirrus cloud thinning focused on high latitudes could support cooling of polar regions. Because it modifies the greenhouse effect rather than the reflection of sunlight, it may avoid some side effects associated with other SRM methods. However, uncertainties remain about its effectiveness, particularly concerning potential impacts on atmospheric circulation and moisture transport.

== Ethical and Governance Considerations ==
Currently, geoengineering efforts have been incredibly slow to implement. Much of this has to do with ethical implications and governance disputes. Because glaciers influence global sea level and climate patterns, local interventions may have consequences that expand beyond national boundaries.

=== Decision-making authority in the Antarctic ===
Proposed glacial geoengineering interventions have raised contention about who would have the authority and responsibility to approve, install, and maintain these efforts. In Antarctica, governance would fall under the Antarctic Treaty System (ATS), though the treaty set aside Antarctica as a scientific preserve and established freedom of environmental protection. The treaty was originally signed by twelve countries, including Argentina, Australia, Chile, Japan, the United Kingdom, and the United States. Since 1959, a further 42 countries have acceded to the treaty. Decisions are based on consensus of 'Consultative Parties', instead of a vote. A country is considered a 'Consultative Party' if they can demonstrate that they do significant research on Antarctica. As of 2026, 30 countries hold this status.

On the topic of geoengineering in the Antarctic, the ATS was not designed to regulate large-scale technological interventions. Key provisions prioritize environmental preservation and require comprehensive impact assessments, which could limit or block experimental, high-risk interventions. By nature, every proposed geoengineering effort is both experimental and high-risk. Additionally, the consensus-based decision process among Consultative Parties introduces the possibility of political deadlock, particularly if proposed projects are perceived to benefit certain nations more than others. This could violate the 'peaceful purposes only' policy of the ATS by making the Antarctic a point of international contention.

Under its current governance structure, the Antarctic is not prepared for large-scale glacial geoengineering. Smaller efforts, such as experimentation of various geoengineering practices could be permitted, but as soon as a perceptible impact on the climate or environment was made, the effort would be in violation of the ATS.
