= Stillings =

Stillings is a surname. Notable people with the surname include:

- Edward Stillings (1823–1890), American lawyer, politician, judge, and businessman
- Vinton Stillings (1852-1933), Kansas State Senator, namesake of Stillings, Missouri
- E.B. Stillings (1839-1888), Adjutant-General, Grand Army of the Republic
- Floyd Stillings (1904-1995), National Rodeo Hall of Fame inductee
- Charles Stillings (d.1917), Director, United States Government Printing Office
- Kemp Stillings (1888-1967), American musician
- Belle Stillings (1922-2016), mother of United States Senator Jeanne Shaheen, descendant of Pocohontas
- Neil Stillings (b.1944), National Science Foundation researcher, Psychologist, author
- John Stillings (b.1955), American Olympic medalist rower
- Jamey Stillings (b.1955), American environmental photographer
- Brad Stillings (b.1988), former American minor league pitcher
- Thomas Stillings, "Between Heaven and Hell"(2008) actor, American Ninja Warrior

== Notable places ==
- Stillings Street, Boston
- Stillings, Missouri

== See also ==
- Stilling
