= Rebecca Senf =

American writer and curator (born 1972)

- Born: 1972 (age 53–54)
- Education: University of Arizona (BA); Boston University (MA, PhD)
- Occupations: Writer; curator
- Children: 2

Rebecca A. "Becky" Senf (born 1972) is an American writer and curator working in the field of photography. She is the Chief Curator at the Center for Creative Photography (CCP). She joined the CCP as Norton Family Assistant Curator in 2007, which was a joint appointment with Phoenix Art Museum, and was promoted to Chief Curator in 2016.

== Biography ==
Senf grew up in Tucson, Arizona, the daughter of an amateur photographer who inspired her early awareness of the medium and the powerful influence of light. She received a B.A. in art history from the University of Arizona in 1994, and M.A. and Ph.D. in Art History from Boston University, in 2001 and 2008 respectively. Her doctoral dissertation was on Ansel Adams.

Senf worked at the Museum of Fine Arts, Boston from 2000 to 2005, where she co-curated a major exhibition of Ansel Adams’ work, with Karen Haas, and co-authored the exhibition catalogue, Ansel Adams from the Lane Collection. In the catalogue, a section created by Senf that reproduces Adams' stamps and labels has become the standard used by major auction houses, such as Christie's and Sotheby's, to indicate which of Adams' stamps/labels appears on a particular work of art, referring to the stamp or label with a Boston Museum of Fine Arts, BMFA number.

During her time at the Center for Creative Photography and Phoenix Art Museum, Senf has curated both contemporary and historical photographic exhibitions, including working with Mark Klett and Byron Wolfe, Linda Connor, and Betsy Schneider, and produced exhibitions on Group f/64, platinum photography, and photographic books.

She currently lives in Tucson and has two children.

== Exhibitions curated by Senf ==
2005: Ansel Adams in the Lane Collection, Museum of Fine Arts, Boston. Co-curated with Karen Haas.

2007: Debating Modern Photography: The Triumph of Group f/64, Phoenix Art Museum, Center for Creative Photography, and Portland Museum of Art [shown in Tucson in 2008 and in ME in 2010].

2008: Richard Avedon: Photographer of Influence, Phoenix Art Museum and Nassau County Museum of Art [shown in NY IN 2011]

2008: Odyssey: Photographs of Linda Connor, Center for Creative Photography, Palm Springs Art Museum, Museum of Art, Rhode Island School of Design, and Southeast Museum of Photography, Daytona, FL [shown in Tucson in 2009, in Palm Springs in 2009/2010, in Rhode Island in 2010 and in Daytona, FL in 2010/2011]

2009: Face to Face: 150 Years of Photographic Portraiture, Phoenix Art Museum

2010: Ansel Adams: Discoveries, Phoenix Art Museum

2011: The Bridge at Hoover Dam: Photographs by Jamey Stillings, Phoenix Art Museum

2014: INFOCUS Exhibition of Self-Published Photobooks, Phoenix Art Museum

2014: All that Glitters is Not Gold: Platinum Photography from the Center for Creative Photography, Phoenix Art Museum

2015: Not MY Family Values, Art Photo Index online

2018: To Be Thirteen: Photographs and Videos by Betsy Schneider, Phoenix Art Museum

2018: Richard Avedon: Relationships, Center for Creative Photography

== Publications ==
In conjunction with exhibitions curated by Senf:

Ansel Adams in the Lane Collection, Boston: Museum of Fine Arts, 2005

Reconstructing the View: The Grand Canyon Photographs of Mark Klett and Byron Wolfe, Berkeley: University of California Press, 2012

David Taylor: Monuments, Santa Fe: Radius Books/Nevada Museum of Art, 2015

Betsy Schneider: To Be Thirteen, Santa Fe: Radius Books/Phoenix Art Museum, 2017

== Books by Senf ==
Making a Photographer: The Early Work of Ansel Adams, New Haven: Yale University Press/Center for Creative Photography, 2020

== Writing contributions by Senf ==
Before and After Photography: Histories and Contexts, New York: Bloomsbury, 2017

== Awards ==
2012: "Best Curator" by the Arizona Republic

2014: "Rising Star Focus Award" by Griffin Museum of Photography in Winchester, MA
