= Knud Friis =

Danish architect (1926–2010)

- Born: 12 March 1926; Stilling, Denmark
- Died: 25 November 2010 (aged 84); Aarhus, Denmark
- Education: Royal Danish Academy of Fine Arts
- Occupation: Architect
- Buildings: Højen 13

Knud Friis (March 12, 1926 – November 25, 2010) was a Danish architect who worked in Denmark and co-founded Friis & Moltke.

== Biography ==
Knud Friis was born in Stilling to Anton Friis and Petra Laurine Laursen and graduated from Herning Gymnasium in 1944. During the Second World War, Friis was active in the Danish resistance in operations for receiving supplies. In 1950 he graduated from the Royal Danish Academy of Fine Arts school of architecture and was subsequently employed at C. F. Møller Architects in Aarhus where he worked on projects for Aarhus University and Aarhus Katedralskole. In 1957 he founded the architects company Friis & Moltke with Elmar Moltke Nielsen. Friis was married on 27 May 1950 in Ringkøbing to Bodil Johanne Andersen.

From 1967 to 1970 he was a professor at the Aarhus School of Architecture and from 1979 to 1989 he operated an architects company in the United States, in collaboration with Jay Robert Larsson, an American Architect. Friis was a guest professor at the Ball State University, Indiana in 1975, a member of Statens Kunstfond from 1977 and chairman of Dansk Arkitektur Center 1987-89. Friis exhibited at the Charlottenborg Spring Exhibition in 1953, 1956–57, 1960, 1962–65, 1967–69, 1974, 1986–87, Charlottenborg Fall Exhibition in 1971, 1981, 1984, the Å-Exhibition in 1958, Forum Copenhagen 1959, Vrå-Exhibition in 1964-93, Aarhus City Hall 1968, Bella Center 1978 og 1980 and in Karlsruhe, Germany 1983.

Friis has received numerous awards including Træprisen in 1959, Eckersberg Medal in 1967, Møbel- og Betonprisen in 1972, the architecture prize of the Association of German Architects in Bayern 1975, Dagbladet Børsens Diploma for commercial buildings in 1978, IF-prisen Gute Industrieform 1982 and C.F. Hansen Medal 1987. He became an Honorary Fellow of the American Institute of Architects in 1983 and an honorary member of the Association of German Architects in 1992.

== Gallery ==
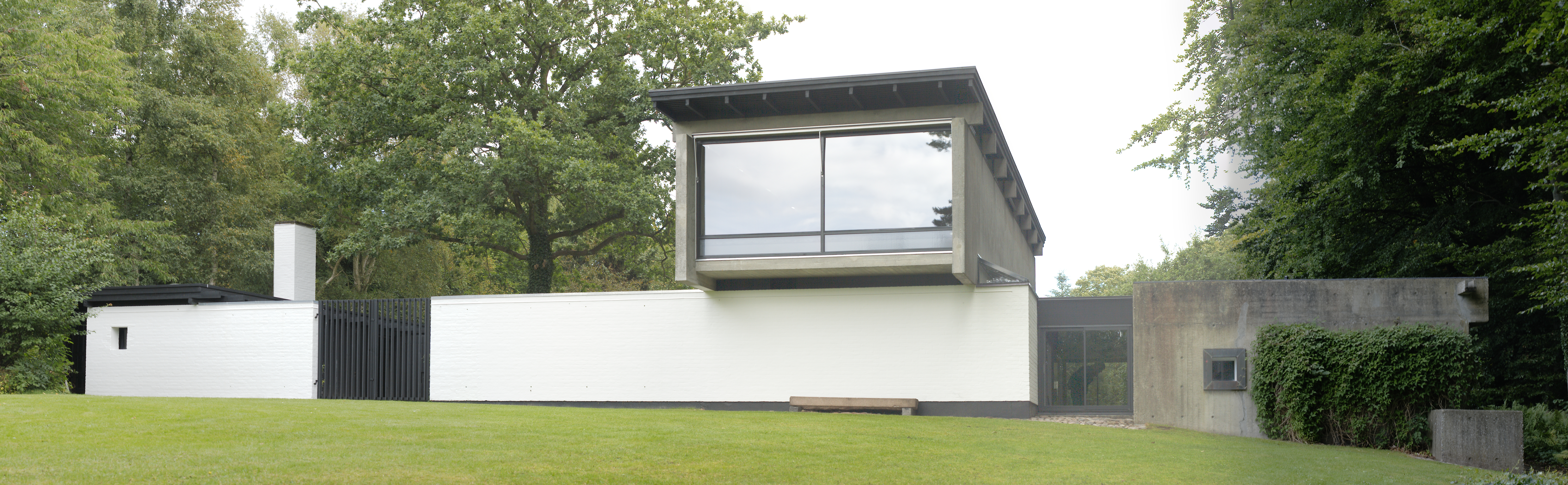
Knud Friis' House

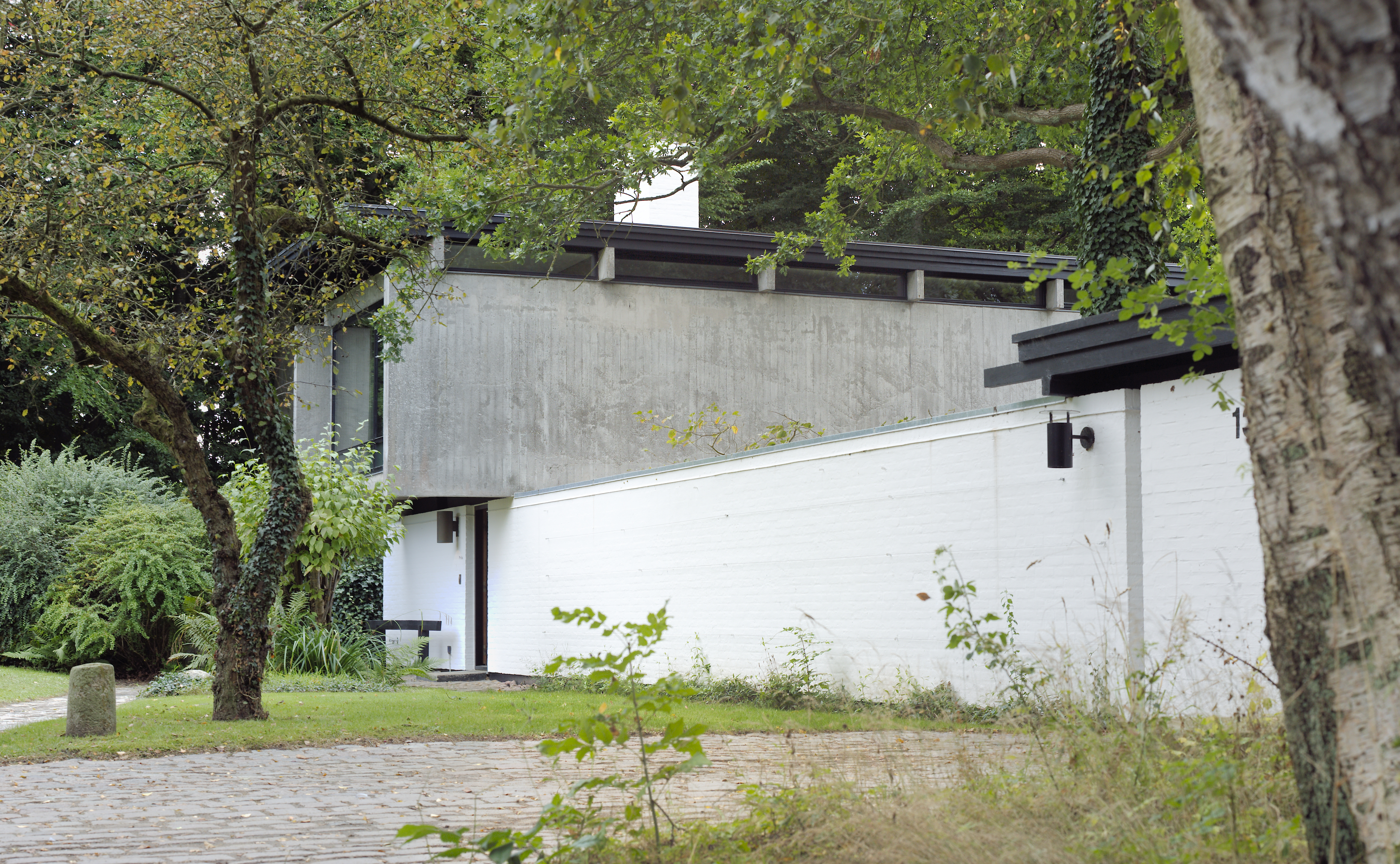

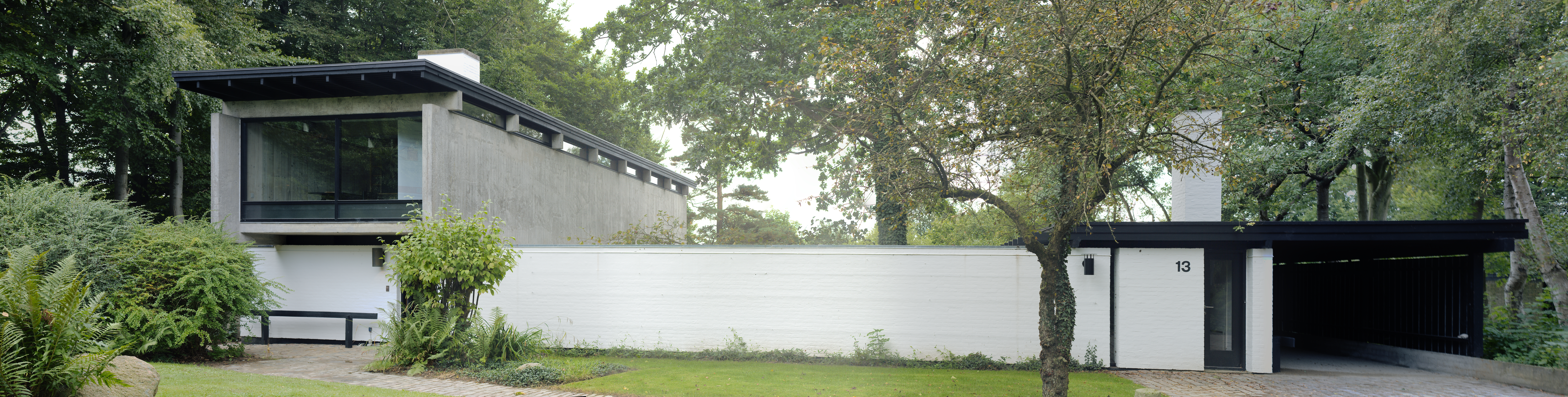
