= Onion Creek Bridge =

Onion Creek Bridge may refer to:

- Onion Creek Bridge, the former name of the bridge in the Moore's Crossing Historic District, in rural Travis County, Texas, nine miles southeast of Austin, Texas
- Onion Creek Bridge (Coffeyville, Kansas), listed on the National Register of Historic Places in Montgomery County, Kansas
