= Mark Klett =

American photographer (born 1952)

Mark Klett (born 9 September 1952) is an American photographer. His work is included in the collections of the Smithsonian American Art Museum, the Museum of Fine Arts Houston and the Museum of Modern Art, New York.

== Life ==
Klett was born in Albany, New York. After graduating from St. Lawrence University with a B.S. in Geology in 1974, he worked as a photographer with the U.S. Geological Survey. In 1977, he completed the MFA program at Visual Studies Workshop in Rochester, New York studying with Nathan Lyons.

He is a Regents Professor and teaches photography at Arizona State University.

== Work ==
Klett's photographic work focuses on the western landscape and man's interaction with it. In particular, his photographs respond to historic images and his projects explore relationships between time, change and perception. This interest has driven his rephotography projects, some in collaboration Byron Wolfe, which included western landscapes, Yosemite, the Grand Canyon, and Glenn Canyon.

With cultural geographer William L. Fox he traveled in 2023 and 2024 to the Republic of the Marshall Islands (RMI), in the mid Pacific to document the legacy of nuclear testing after WWII, exacerbated by rising sea levels caused by climate change. Their collaboration resulted in The Half Life of History (2011), and Remember the Future. Nuclear Testing, Rising Seas, and The Marshall Islands (2026).

== Publications ==
- Second View: The Rephotographic Survey Project. With Ellen Manchester and JoAnn Verburg, University of New Mexico Press, 1984.
- Traces of Eden: Travels in the Desert Southwest. David R. Godine, 1986.
- Headlands: the Marin Coast at the Golden Gate. With Miles De Coster, Mike Mandel, Paul Metcalf, and Larry Sultan, University of New Mexico Press, 1989.
- One City/Two Visions. Bedford Arts Publishers, San Francisco, CA, 1990.
- Photographing Oklahoma. 1889-1991. Oklahoma City Art Museum, 1991.
- Revealing Territory. University of New Mexico Press, 1992.
- Capitol View: A New Panorama of Washington DC. With Merry Foresta, Smithsonian Institution and Book Studios, 1994.
- Desert Legends: Restoring the Sonoran Borderlands. With Gary Paul Nabhan, Henry Holt, 1994.
- The Black Rock Desert. With Bill Fox, University of Arizona Press, 2002. ISBN 0816521727.
- Third Views, Second Sights, A Rephotographic Survey of the American West. Museum of New Mexico Press, 2004. With Byron Wolfe. ISBN 0-89013-432-4.
- Yosemite in Time: Ice Ages, Tree Clocks, Ghost Rivers. With Rebecca Solnit and Byron Wolfe, Trinity University Press, 2005. ISBN 1-59534-042-4.
- After the Ruins: Rephotographing the 1906 San Francisco Earthquake and Fire. University of California Press, 2005. ISBN 0-520-24556-3.
- Mark Klett: Saguaros by Gregory McNamee and Mark Klett. Radius Books, 2007. ISBN 1-934435-00-7.
- The Half Life of History, with William Fox. Radius Books, 2011. ISBN 978-1934435397
- Reconstructing the View, the Grand Canyon Photographs of Mark Klett and Byron Wolfe, with Byron Wolfe, Rebecca A. Senf, Stephen J. Pyne. University of California Press, 2012. ISBN 978-0520273900
- Camino del Diablo, Radius Books, 2017. With Raphael Pumpelly ISBN 978-1942185017
- Drowned River: The Death and Rebirth of Glen Canyon on the Colorado, with Rebecca Solnit and Byron Wolfe. Radius Books, 2018. ISBN 978-1942185253
- Seeing Time: Forty Years of Photographs, Anne Wilkes Tucker, Keith E. Davis, Rebecca A. Senf. University of Texas Press, 2020. ISBN 978-1477320235
- Fox, William L.; Klett, Mark (2026). Remember the Future. Nuclear Testing, Rising Seas, and The Marshall Islands. Santa Fe: Radius Books. ISBN 9798890181275.

== Awards ==
- 1979: Emerging Artist Fellowship for the National Endowment for the Arts
- 1982: National Endowment for the Arts Fellowship
- 1984: National Endowment for the Arts Fellowship
- 1993: Photographer of the Year from Friends of Photography
- Japan/U.S. Creative Artist Fellowship
- 2001: Regents' Professor, Arizona State University
- 2004: Guggenheim Fellowship

== Collections ==
Klett's work is held in the following permanent collections:

- Museum of Fine Arts Houston
- Museum of Modern Art, New York: 33 prints (as of 26 September 2021)
- Smithsonian American Art Museum
