= Edward Stillings =

American politician

Representative, Kansas Legislature

Judge Pro Tem, Kansas District Court

District Attorney, Leavenworth, Kansas

Representative, Ohio Assembly

Personal details
- Born: July 9, 1823 Havre de Grace, Maryland
- Died: February 20, 1890 (aged 66) Leavenworth, Kansas
- Party: Whig, Republican
- Spouse: Mary Smith
- Children: Sen. Vinton Stillings

Edward Stillings (July 9, 1823 – February 20, 1890) was an American lawyer, politician, judge, and businessman.

== Early life ==
Edward Stillings was born in Havre de Grace, Maryland in the early 19th century. He was the son of James Stillings and Mary Barnes, a descendant of Sir George Barne III. His parents descended from English immigrants of the colonial era who participated in the American Revolution as intelligence operatives, among other activities. His father James would serve in the War of 1812.

His parents were planters and slaveholders. However, the institution of slavery never appealed to them, and they freed their slaves. They moved west to Springfield, Ohio in 1828, before settling in Union County, Ohio in 1834, on 300 acres (1.2 km^{2}) that his father had purchased. James would be a trustee of Allen Township in Union County in 1841 and 1847, and Edward's brother Thomas, who married Somelia Dynes, would serve as an assessor from 1849-1855. He died serving with the Union army during the American Civil War and was Y-dna haplogroup R-M405.

Edward was raised in a Christian home, the common religion of the era, and was well-educated as a young man, going on to graduate from Augusta College in Kentucky, studying the classics and mastering the Greek language. Edward decided he wanted to pursue law as a profession, and would ride his horse to Massachusetts to enroll in the Law Department at Harvard University. After receiving his law degree, he returned to Ohio, clerking for Judge Cole in Marysville, Ohio before establishing his own practice after being admitted to the bar in Cincinnati in April 1846.

=== Marriage and family ===
Edward married Mary Smith on December 29, 1851 Mary was the granddaughter of Lt. Col. Cyrus Smith, who served under General Hull during the War of 1812 and for whom Edward had known from Maryland. Mary died in July 1894, four years after Edward died in 1890.

==== Vinton Stillings ====
One of their sons, Vinton, was born in 1852. Vinton was educated at the Phillips Exeter Academy in New Hampshire where he was class president in 1874. However, he was educated at the University of Heidelberg in Germany after lacking interest to attend Yale as Exeter had prepared him for. He eventually became a State Senator in Kansas in 1904 and served many terms. He was noted for infrastructure development, including the financing of the Terminal Bridge in Leavenworth. Stillings, Missouri is named after him.

== Political and legal career ==
Stillings became involved in politics soon after returning to Ohio, first as a member of the Whig Party, and eventually an original member of the Republican Party. In 1851 he was elected to the Kenton City Council and later to the Ohio General Assembly as a Republican representative. Notable legislation while there included Edward authoring the first turnpike law in Ohio history.

Edward was part of the Abolition movement, and operated on the Underground Railroad. He liberated many slaves to Canada.

With the outbreak of the American Civil War, many of Edward's relatives would serve on the Union side. He was appointed to the Military Committee of Hardin County by the Governor William Dennison, Jr. in 1861. Shortly thereafter, a friend of Edward's he knew earlier in life from Kenton, Ohio, Thomas Carney, had become the Governor of Kansas. At his request to come to Kansas to help forge the infant state ahead, Edward accepted.

=== Kansas ===
Edward arrived in Leavenworth, Kansas in 1863. He was appointed city attorney of Leavenworth by the Carney administration. He would also be active in the business world, operating wagon trains across Kansas to forward goods to California and helping to construct the Kansas Central Railway. He would serve as the attorney for the First National Bank in Leavenworth, Kansas Central Railroad, Leavenworth and Atchison Railroad, and many other corporations in Kansas. A notable client also included Brigham Young of Salt Lake City.

He would be elected several times to the Kansas Legislature, where he was at one time the Chairman of the Judiciary Committee and would serve as a Judge pro tem of the District Court. In 1877 as Chairman of the Judiciary Committee, he would create the positions of three commissioners to codify the laws of the state, in which he would be appointed to one of those positions. Having a wealth of knowledge of the Ohio code from his days in the legislature there, much of the Kansas code would be copied from Ohio's. Stillings would argue many cases before the Supreme Court of the United States. He was considered one of the preeminent jurists in Kansas of that time.

The Edward Stillings House, an Italianate architecture home built in 1875, is located at 303 N. Esplanade in the North Esplanade Historic District of Leavenworth and listed among the National Register of Historic Places. It was later owned by Italian hotelier Ferdinand Jesus Mella.
