= Terminal Bridge (Leavenworth, Kansas) =

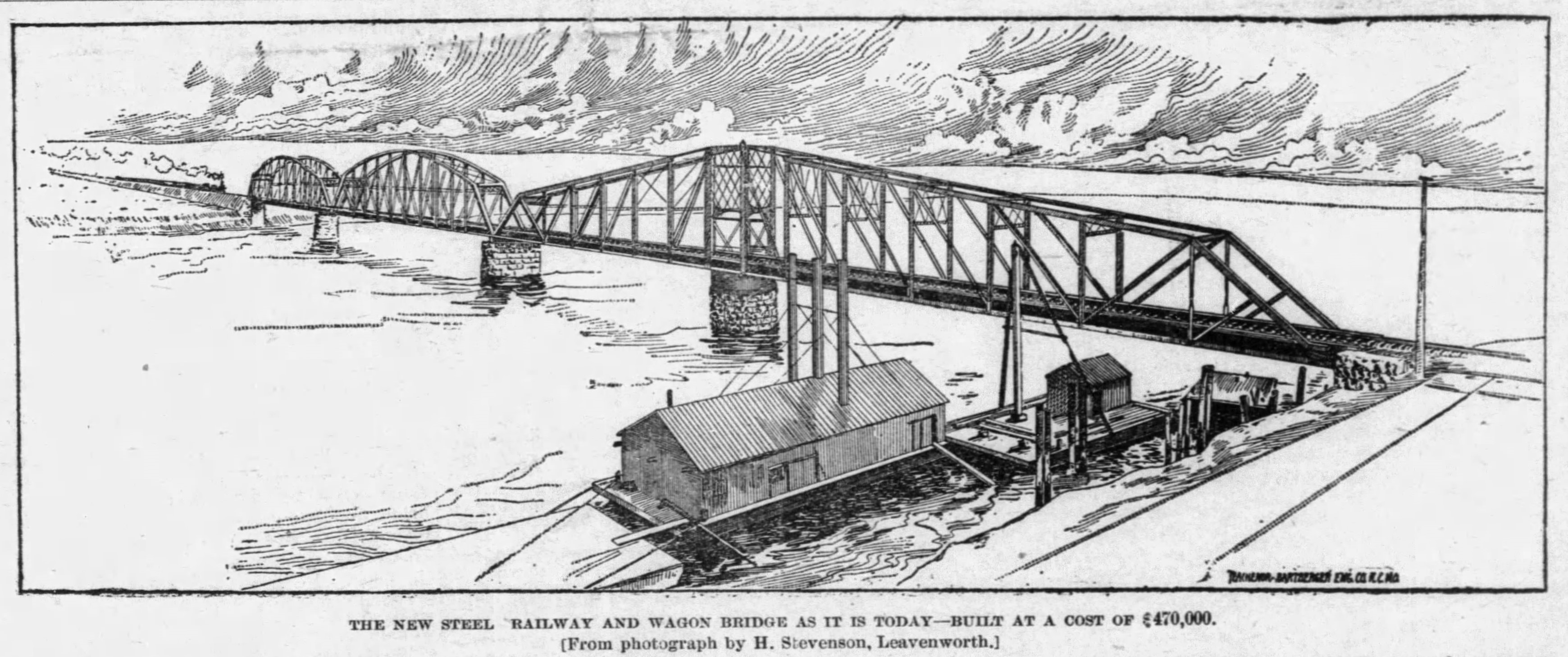
- Coordinates: 39°19′02″N 94°54′24″W
- Carries: Rail, road, and pedestrians
- Crosses: Missouri River
- Locale: Leavenworth, Kansas and Stillings, Missouri

Characteristics
- Design: Through-truss swing bridge
- Total length: 1,100 feet (340 m)
- Longest span: 330 feet (100 m); Moveable span 220 feet (67 m)
- No. of spans: 4
- Piers in water: 3

History
- Engineering design by: Colonel George S. Morison
- Construction start: December 20, 1892
- Construction end: December 30, 1893
- Inaugurated: January 2, 1894
- Closed: 1987

Location
- Interactive map of Terminal Bridge

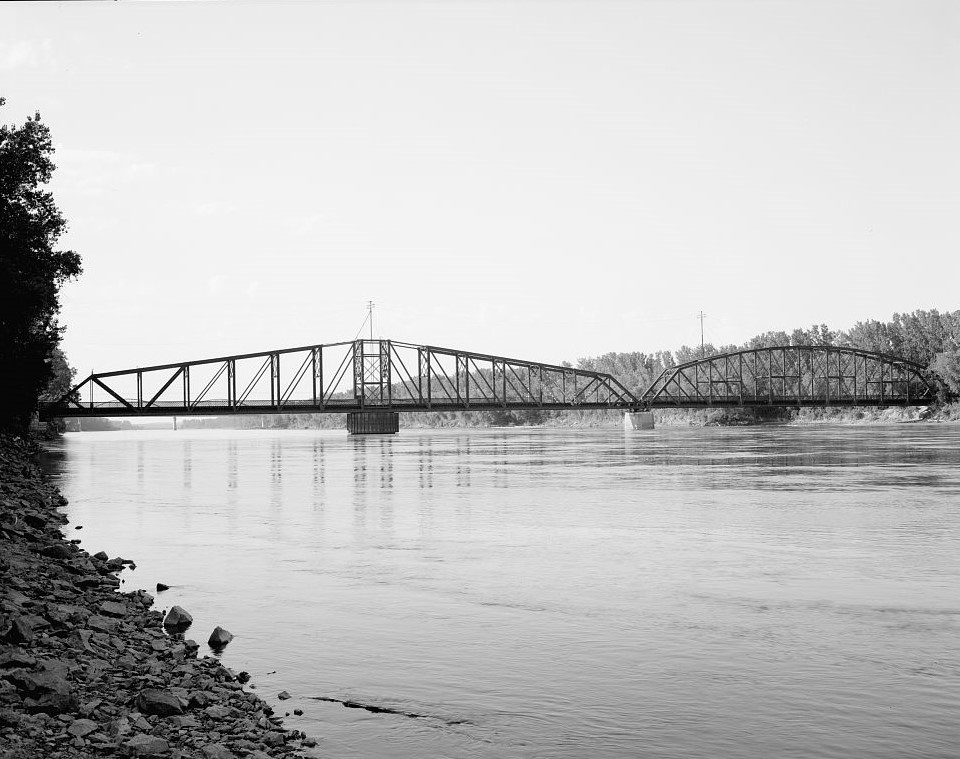
Photo of the Terminal Bridge looking north from the Kansas side.

The Terminal Bridge was a pontoon bridge and then a through-truss swing bridge at Leavenworth, Kansas. The pontoon bridge opened in 1889. The steel truss bridge opened on January 2, 1894, and was demolished in 1987.

== History ==
Not long after the opening of the Fort Bridge, the people of Leavenworth found they were not getting the benefits of growth and prosperity expected from access to lands north and west of town. Judge Edward Stillings was one of the most vocal citizens for a new bridge closer to town. Judge Stillings died in 1890, before the steel bridge opened. A plaque was installed on the bridge in his honor.

Prior to construction of the swing bridge, a pontoon bridge with a moveable span was at this location. Judge Stillings and others formed the Leavenworth Bridge Company and received a charter from Congress in 1884 to build either a fixed or moveable bridge. The bridge chartered by this act was not built. Instead a pontoon bridge would be chartered to the Leavenworth and Platte County Bridge Company in 1889. Judge Stillings' son, Vinton Stillings, financed the work. In the summer of 1889, twenty thousand people attended the opening of the pontoon bridge and watched a town fire truck drive across the span. Success of the pontoon bridge led to the decision to replace it with a steel structure.

The Leavenworth Terminal Railway & Bridge Company was established in January 1892 to build a second bridge across the Missouri River and expand the rail infrastructure in Leavenworth. The company was formed by Elmore W. Snyder and Vinton Stillings. The charter to operate the pontoon bridge and to construct the moveable swing bridge transferred to the new company.

Construction of the swing bridge started on December 20, 1892, and was completed by December 30, 1893, when the first train crossed. The bridge opened to carry trains, vehicles (wagons), and pedestrians across the river. There were three fatalities during construction of the bridge. Two workers fell into the river and the third was crushed by a falling derrick.

The Leavenworth Standard reported that there were eight thousand people present on January 2, 1894 for the opening ceremony of the bridge. The parade included cavalry troops from nearby Fort Leavenworth.

When the Fort Bridge reopened as a toll-free vehicular bridge, the operators of the Terminal Bridge removed the wooden decking and no longer allowed vehicles and pedestrians to cross. The bridge was demolished in 1987 by Carney Bridge Demolition Company. Seven hundred twenty pounds of explosives were used to demolish the final pier to be removed.

== Design and construction ==
The Terminal Bridge was a swing bridge with through truss spans. The bridge was designed by Colonel George S. Morison. The pivot span was a truss 440 feet (130 m) in length with two equal spans of 220 feet (67 m). There were two approach spans of 330 feet (100 m) on the east side of the pivot truss. The three central piers were constructed on pneumatic caissons, and the two end piers were on pile foundations. The truss was built with both steel and wrought iron members, and also included wooden decking.

Construction of the substructure was completed by Missouri Valley Bridge and Iron Company. Construction of the superstructure was completed by Union Bridge Company of New York.

== See also ==
- List of bridges documented by the Historic American Engineering Record in Kansas
- List of bridges documented by the Historic American Engineering Record in Missouri
- List of crossings of the Missouri River
- Swing bridge
- History of rail transportation in the United States
