= List of bridges documented by the Historic American Engineering Record in Kansas =

This is a list of bridges documented by the Historic American Engineering Record in the U.S. state of Kansas.

== Bridges ==
Survey No.	Name (as assigned by HAER)	Status	Type	Built	Documented	Carries	Crosses	Location	County	Coordinates
KS-1	Half-Mound Bridge	Demolished	Baltimore truss	1900	1981	CR 1325	Delaware River	Valley Falls	Jefferson	39°24′22″N 95°30′22″W
KS-2	Meriden Rock Creek Bridge	Replaced	Bowstring arch truss	1879	1981		Rock Creek	Meriden	Jefferson	39°11′50″N 95°33′09″W
KS-5	Enterprise Parker Truss Bridge	Replaced	Parker truss	1924	1985	K-43	Smoky Hill River	Enterprise	Dickinson	38°54′24″N 97°07′13″W
KS-6	Leavenworth Bridge (Note: See also HAER No. NE-2, "Nebraska City Bridge" for additional documentation)	Demolished	Swing bridge	1894	1985	Leavenworth Terminal Railway	Missouri River	Leavenworth, Kansas, and East Leavenworth, Missouri	Leavenworth County, Kansas, and Platte County, Missouri	39°19′02″N 94°54′24″W
KS-7	Parker Bridge	Replaced	Parker truss	1871	1987	CR 1420	Verdigris River	Coffeyville	Montgomery	37°00′20″N 95°35′32″W
KS-8	Onion Creek Bridge	Extant	Parker truss	1911	1989	CR 4500	Onion Creek	Coffeyville	Montgomery	37°01′33″N 95°39′23″W
