= Global dimming =

Reduction in the amount of sunlight reaching Earth's surface

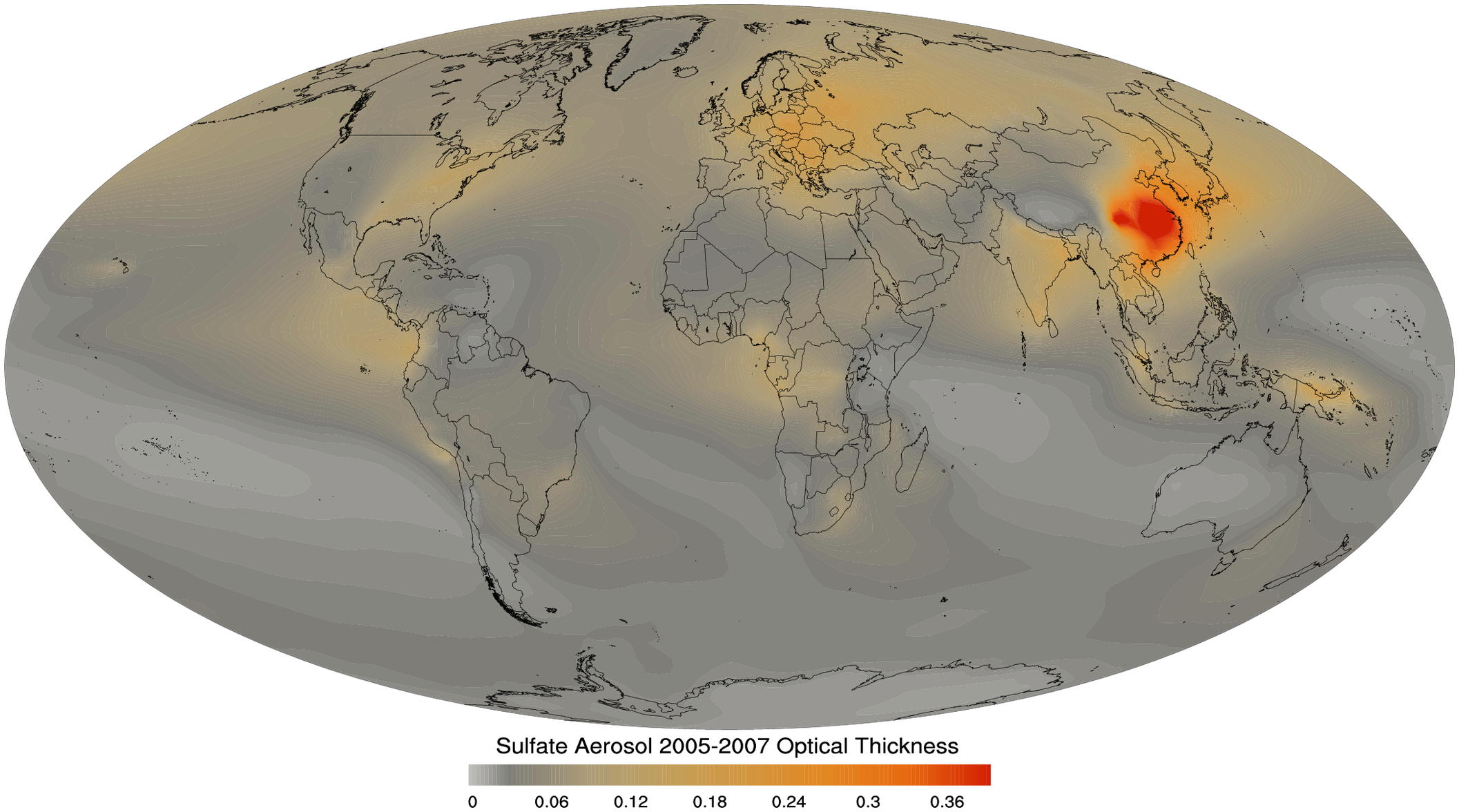
Hotspots of sulfate aerosol pollution in 2005–2007 are highlighted in orange. Such sulfates rarely occur naturally outside of volcanic activity, and their increased levels are the main cause of global dimming.

Global dimming is a decline in the amount of sunlight reaching the Earth's surface. It is caused by atmospheric particulate matter, predominantly sulfate aerosols, which are components of air pollution. Global dimming was observed soon after the first systematic measurements of solar irradiance began in the 1950s. This weakening of visible sunlight proceeded at the rate of 4–5% per decade until the 1980s. During these years, air pollution increased due to post-war industrialization. Solar activity did not vary more than the usual during this period.

Aerosols have a cooling effect on the earth's atmosphere, and global dimming has masked the extent of global warming experienced to date, with the most polluted regions even experiencing cooling in the 1970s. The opposite effects it has on global warming appears to be beneficial to the environment. Global dimming has interfered with the water cycle by lowering evaporation, and thus has probably reduced rainfall in certain areas. It may have weakened the Monsoon of South Asia and caused the entire tropical rain belt to shift southwards between 1950 and 1985, with a limited recovery afterwards. Record levels of particulate pollution in the Northern Hemisphere caused or at least exacerbated the monsoon failure behind the 1984 Ethiopian famine.

Since the 1980s, a decrease in air pollution has led to a partial reversal of the dimming trend, sometimes referred to as global brightening. This global brightening had contributed to the acceleration of global warming, which began in the 1990s. According to climate models, the dimming effect of aerosols most likely offsets around 0.5 °C (0.9 °F) of warming as of 2021. As nations act to reduce the toll of air pollution on the health of their citizens, the masking effect on global warming is expected to decline further. The scenarios for climate action required to meet 1.5 °C (2.7 °F) and 2 °C (3.6 °F) targets incorporate the predicted decrease in aerosol levels. However, model simulations of the effects of aerosols on weather systems remain uncertain.

The processes behind global dimming are similar to stratospheric aerosol injection. This is a proposed solar geoengineering intervention which aims to counteract global warming through intentional releases of reflective aerosols. Stratospheric aerosol injection could be very effective at stopping or reversing warming but it would also have substantial effects on the global water cycle, regional weather, and ecosystems. Furthermore, it would have to be carried out over centuries to prevent a rapid and violent return of the warming.

== History ==
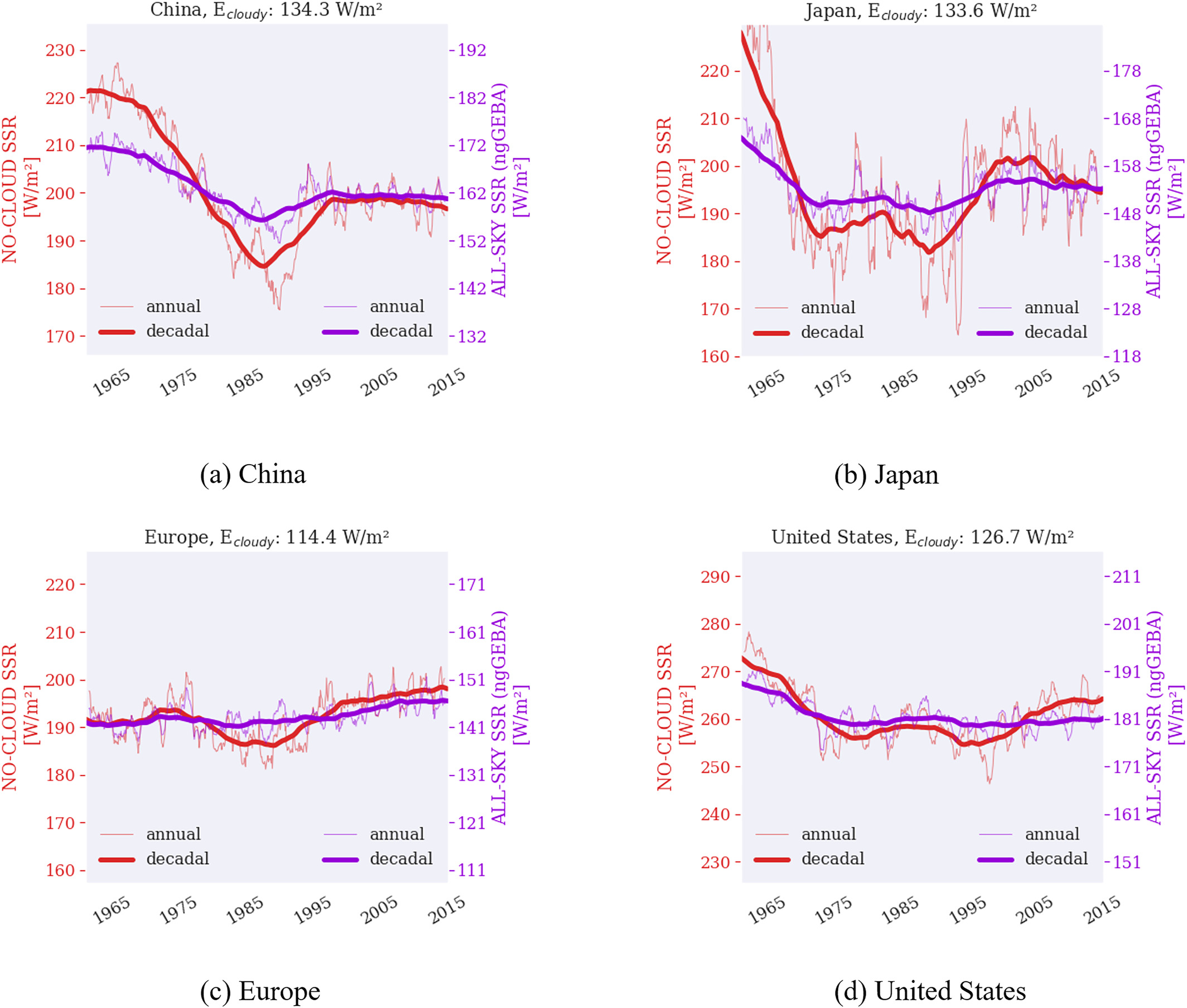
The observed trends of global dimming and brightening in four major geographic regions. The dimming was greater on the average cloud-free days (red line) than on the average of all days (purple line), strongly suggesting that sulfate aerosols were the cause.

In the 1970s, numerous studies showed that atmospheric aerosols could affect the propagation of sunlight through the atmosphere, a measure also known as direct solar irradiance. One study showed that less sunlight was filtering through at the height of 1.7 km (1.1 mi) above Los Angeles, even on those days when there was no visible smog. Another suggested that sulfate pollution or a volcano eruption could provoke the onset of an ice age. In the 1980s, Atsumu Ohmura, a geography researcher at the Swiss Federal Institute of Technology, found that solar radiation striking the Earth's surface had declined by more than 10% over the three previous decades, even as the global temperature had been generally rising since the 1970s. In the 1990s, this was followed by the papers describing multi-decade declines in Estonia, Germany, Israel and across the former Soviet Union.

Subsequent research estimated an average reduction in sunlight striking the terrestrial surface of around 4–5% per decade over the late 1950s–1980s, and 2–3% per decade when 1990s were included. Notably, solar radiation at the top of the atmosphere did not vary by more than 0.1–0.3% in all that time, strongly suggesting that the reasons for the dimming were on Earth. Additionally, only visible light and infrared radiation were dimmed, rather than the ultraviolet part of the spectrum. Further, the dimming had occurred even when the skies were clear, and it was in fact stronger than during the cloudy days, proving that it was not caused by changes in cloud cover alone.

== Causes ==
=== Anthropogenic sulfates ===
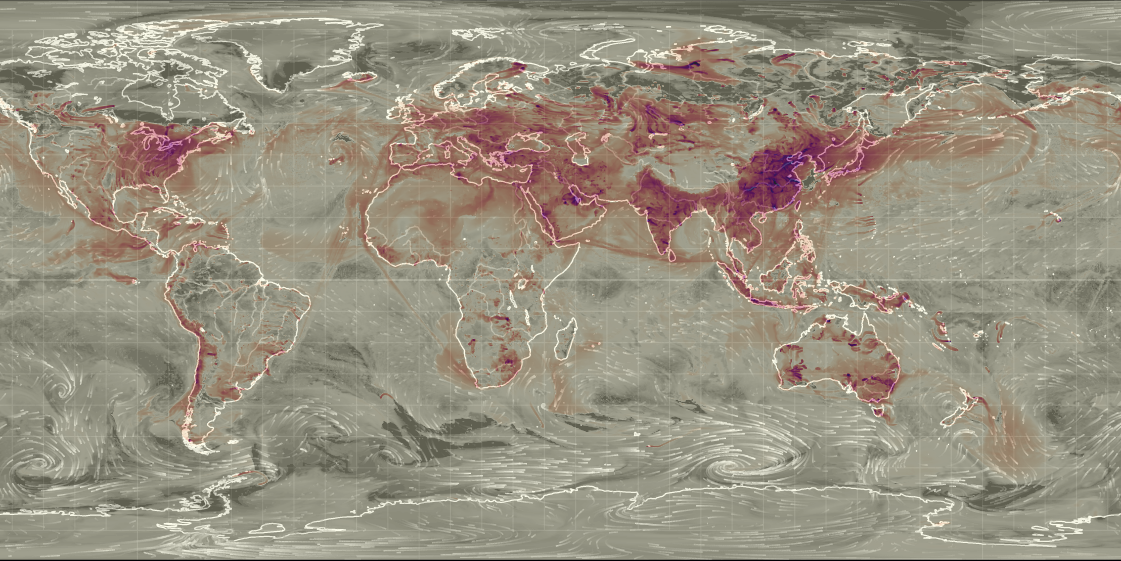
Satellite snapshot of atmospheric sulfur dioxide on 15 April 2017. Sulfur dioxide forms highly reflective sulfates, which are considered the main cause of global dimming.

Global dimming is primarily caused by the presence of sulfate particles which hang in the Earth's atmosphere as aerosols. These aerosols have both a direct contribution to dimming, as they reflect sunlight like tiny mirrors. They also have an indirect effect as nuclei, meaning that water droplets in clouds coalesce around the particles. Increased pollution causes more particulates and thereby creates clouds consisting of a greater number of smaller droplets (that is, the same amount of water is spread over more droplets). The smaller droplets make clouds more reflective, so that more incoming sunlight is reflected back into space and less reaches the Earth's surface. In models, these smaller droplets also decrease rainfall.

Before the Industrial Revolution, the main source of sulfate aerosols was dimethyl sulfide produced by some types of oceanic plankton. Emissions from volcano activity were the second largest source, although large volcanic eruptions, such as the 1991 eruption of Mount Pinatubo, dominate in the years when they occur. In 1990, the IPCC First Assessment Report estimated dimethyl sulfide emissions at 40 million tons per year, while volcano emissions were estimated at 10 million tons. These annual levels have been largely stable for a long time. On the other hand, global human-caused emissions of sulfur into the atmosphere increased from less than 3 million tons per year in 1860 to 15 million tonnes in 1900, 40 million tonnes in 1940 and about 80 million tonnes in 1980. This meant that by 1980, the human-caused emissions from the burning of sulfur-containing fuels (mostly coal and bunker fuel) became at least as large as all natural emissions of sulfur-containing compounds. The report also concluded that "in the industrialized regions of Europe and North America, anthropogenic emissions dominate over natural emissions by about a factor of ten or even more".

=== Black carbon ===
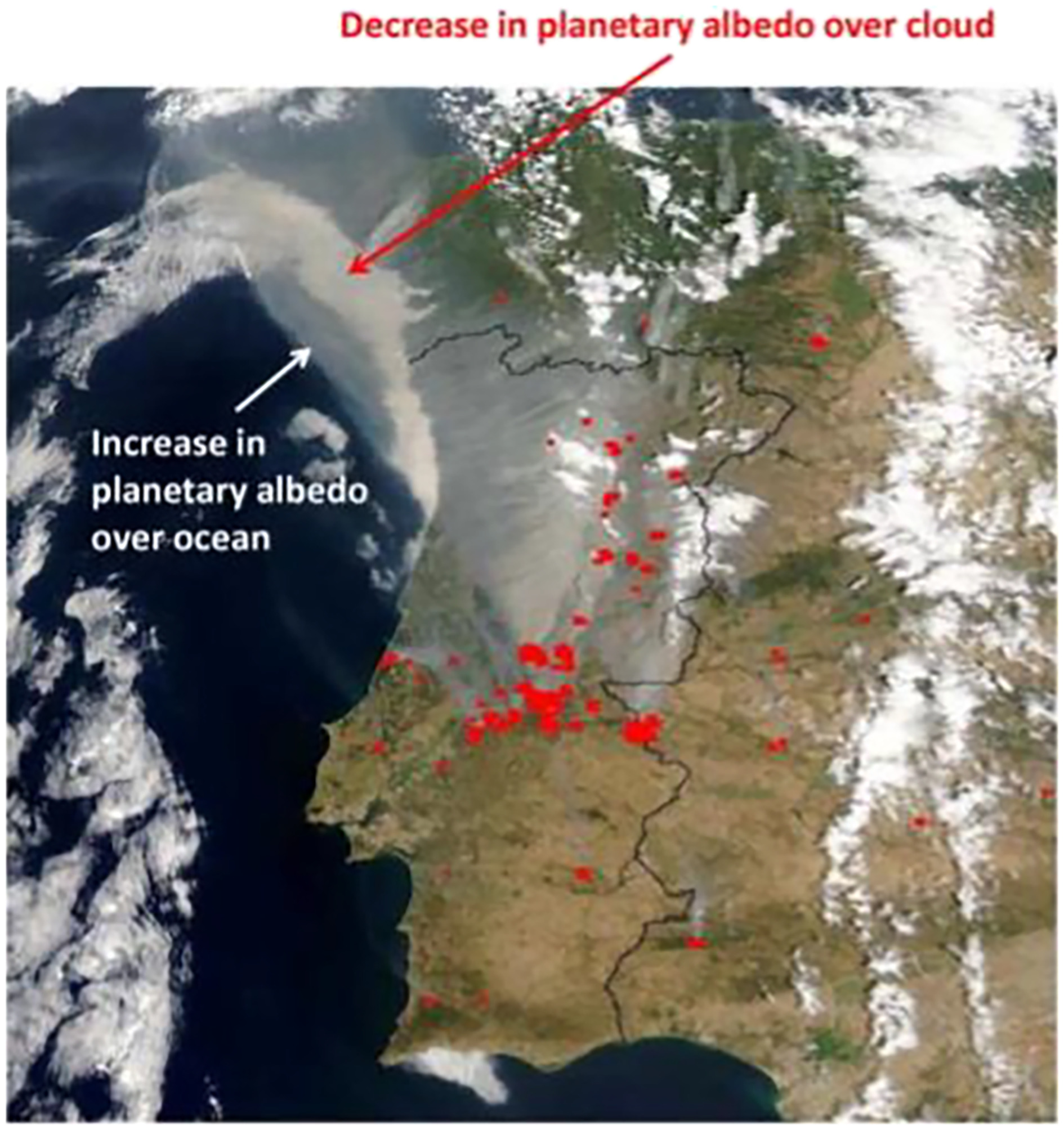
If smoke from wildfires mixes into clouds, it darkens them, decreasing their albedo. If there are no clouds, then smoke can increase albedo, particularly over oceans.

Another important type of aerosol is black carbon, colloquially known as soot. It is formed due to incomplete combustion of fossil fuels, as well as of wood and other plant matter. Globally, the single largest source of black carbon is from grassland and forest fires, including both wildfires and intentional burning. However, coal use is responsible for the majority (60 to 80%) of black carbon emissions in Asia and Africa, while diesel combustion produces 70% of black carbon in Europe and The Americas.

Black carbon in the lower atmosphere is a major contributor to 7 million premature deaths caused by air pollution every year. Its presence is particularly visible, as the so-called "brown clouds" appear in heavily polluted areas. In fact, it was 1970s research into the Denver brown cloud which had first found that black carbon particles absorb solar energy and so can affect the amount of visible sunlight. Later research found that black carbon is 190 times more effective at absorbing sunlight within clouds than the regular dust from soil particles. At worst, all clouds within an atmospheric layer 3–5 km (1.9–3.1 mi) thick are visibly darkened, and the plume can reach transcontinental scale (i.e. the Asian brown cloud.) Even so, the overall dimming from black carbon is much lower than that from the sulfate particles.

== Reversal ==
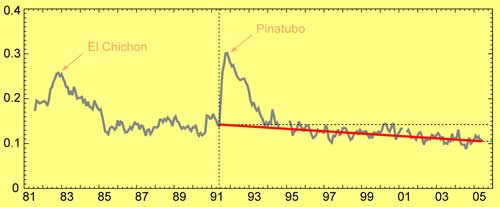
Sun-blocking aerosols around the world steadily declined (red line) since the 1991 eruption of Mount Pinatubo, according to satellite estimates.

After 1990, the global dimming trend had clearly switched to global brightening. This followed measures taken to combat air pollution by the developed nations, typically through flue-gas desulfurization installations at thermal power plants, such as wet scrubbers or fluidized bed combustion. In the United States, sulfate aerosols have declined significantly since 1970 with the passage of the Clean Air Act, which was strengthened in 1977 and 1990. According to the EPA, from 1970 to 2005, total emissions of the six principal air pollutants, including sulfates, dropped by 53% in the US. By 2010, this reduction in sulfate pollution led to estimated healthcare cost savings valued at $50 billion annually. Similar measures were taken in Europe, such as the 1985 Helsinki Protocol on the Reduction of Sulfur Emissions under the Convention on Long-Range Transboundary Air Pollution, and with similar improvements.

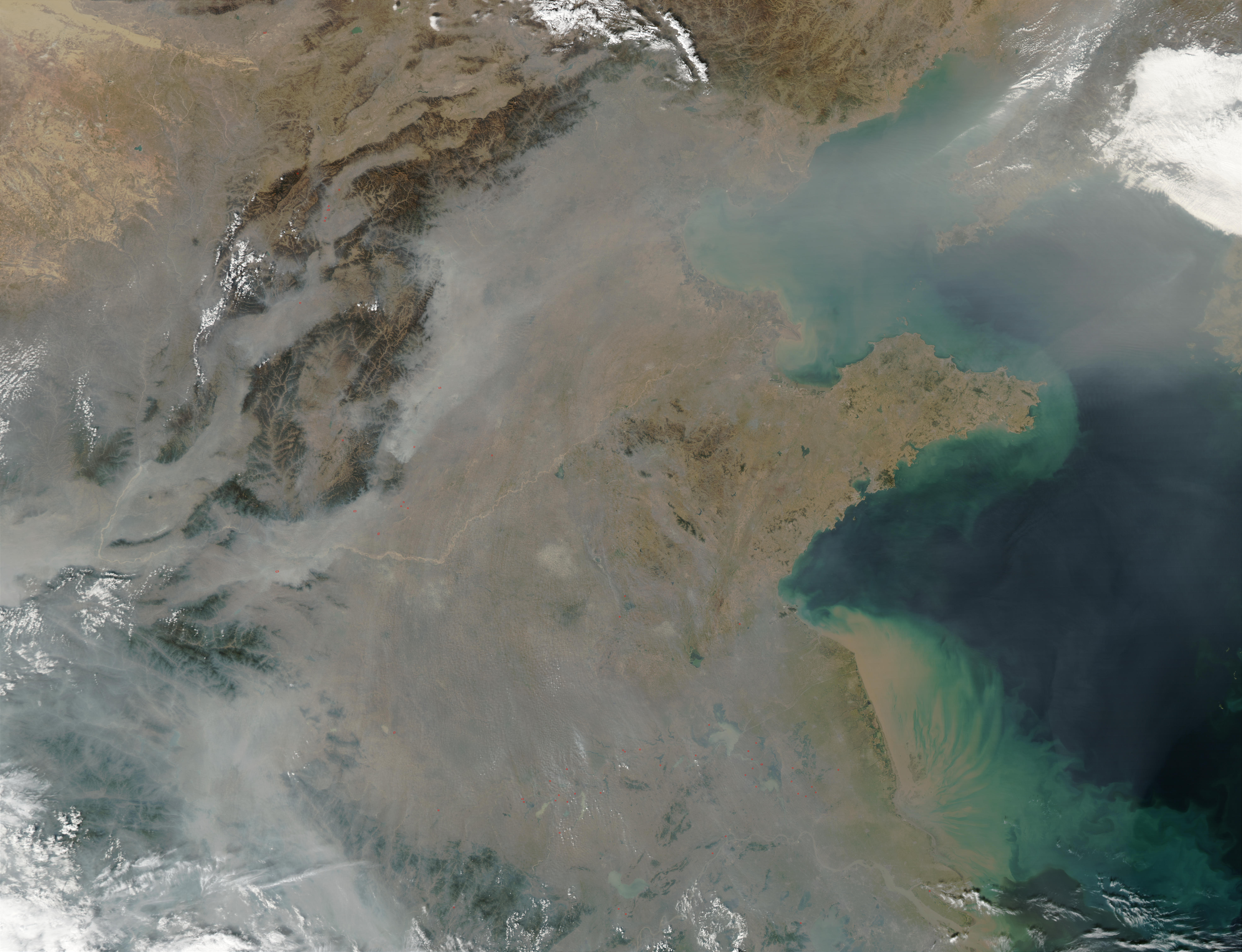
Satellite photo showing a thick pall of smoke and haze from forest fires in Eastern China. Such smoke is full of black carbon, which contributes to dimming trends but has an overall warming effect.

On the other hand, a 2009 review found that dimming continued to increase in China after stabilizing in the 1990s and intensified in India, consistent with their continued industrialization, while the US, Europe, and South Korea continued to brighten. Evidence from Zimbabwe, Chile and Venezuela also pointed to increased dimming during that period, albeit at a lower confidence level due to the lower number of observations. Later research found that over China, the dimming trend continued at a slower rate after 1990, and did not begin to reverse until around 2005. Due to these contrasting trends, no statistically significant change had occurred on a global scale from 2001 to 2012. Post-2010 observations indicate that the global decline in aerosol concentrations and global dimming continued, with pollution controls on the global shipping industry playing a substantial role in the recent years. Since nearly 90% of the human population lives in the Northern Hemisphere, clouds there are far more affected by aerosols than in the Southern Hemisphere, but these differences have halved in the two decades since 2000, providing further evidence for the ongoing global brightening.

== Relationship to climate change ==
=== Cooling from sulfate aerosols ===
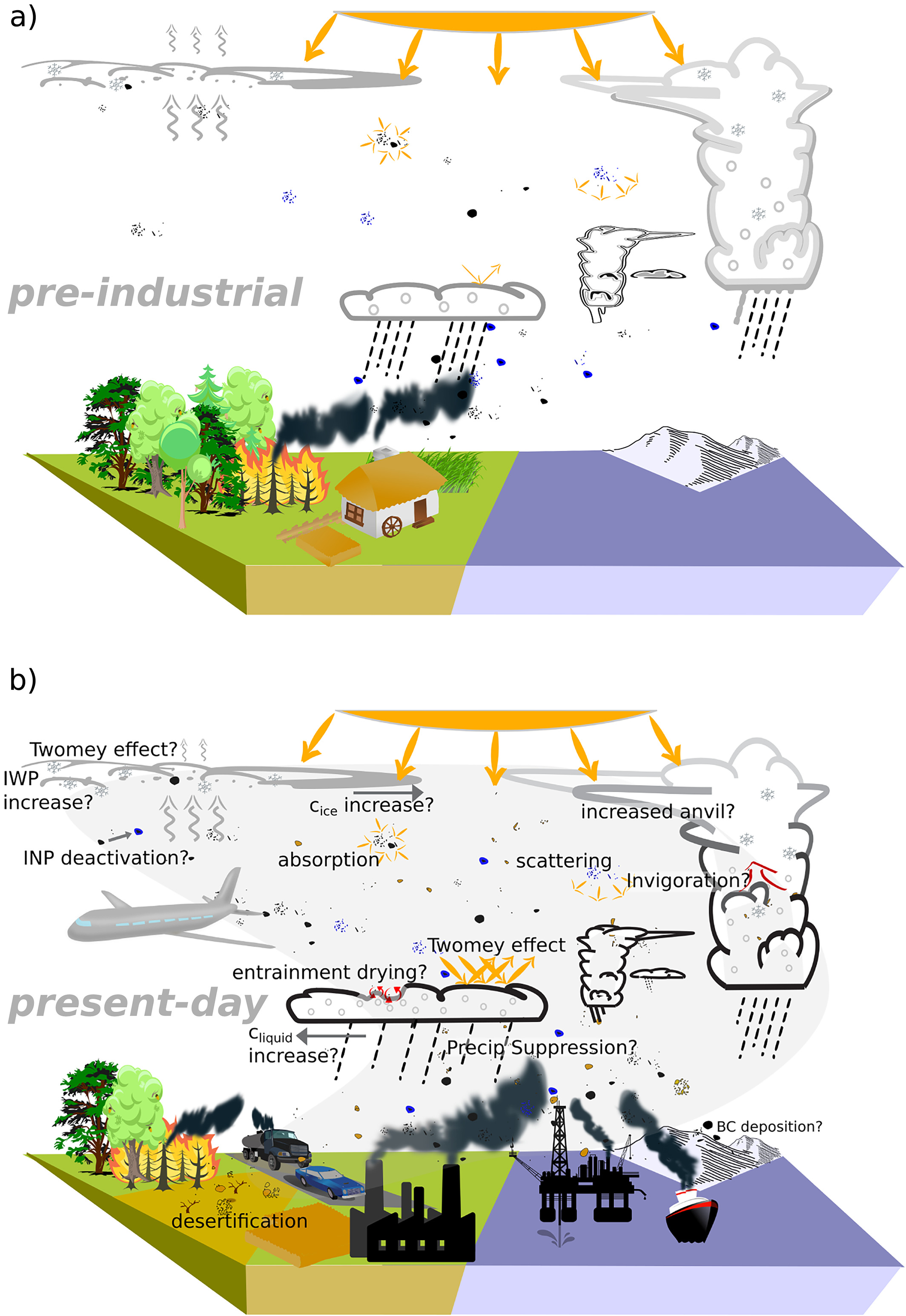
Air pollution, including from large-scale land clearing, has substantially increased the presence of aerosols in the atmosphere when compared to the preindustrial background levels. Different types of particles have different effects, and there is a variety of interactions in different atmospheric layers. Overall, they provide cooling, but complexity makes the exact strength of cooling very difficult to estimate.

Aerosols have a cooling effect, which has masked the total extent of global warming experienced to date.

It has been understood for a long time that any effect on solar irradiance from aerosols would necessarily impact Earth's radiation balance. Reductions in atmospheric temperatures have already been observed after large volcanic eruptions such as the 1963 eruption of Mount Agung in Bali, 1982 El Chichón eruption in Mexico, 1985 Nevado del Ruiz eruption in Colombia and 1991 eruption of Mount Pinatubo in the Philippines. However, even the major eruptions only result in temporary jumps of sulfur particles, unlike the more sustained increases caused by anthropogenic pollution.

In 1990, the IPCC First Assessment Report acknowledged that "Human-made aerosols, from sulphur emitted largely in fossil fuel combustion can modify clouds and this may act to lower temperatures", while "a decrease in emissions of sulphur might be expected to increase global temperatures". However, lack of observational data and difficulties in calculating indirect effects on clouds left the report unable to estimate whether the total impact of all anthropogenic aerosols on the global temperature amounted to cooling or warming. By 1995, the IPCC Second Assessment Report had confidently assessed the overall impact of aerosols as negative (cooling); however, aerosols were recognized as the largest source of uncertainty in future projections in that report and the subsequent ones.

=== Warming from black carbon ===
Unlike sulfate pollution, black carbon contributes to both global dimming and global warming, since its particles absorb sunlight and heat up instead of reflecting it away. These particles also develop thick coatings over time, which can increase the initial absorption by up to 40%. Because the rate at which these coatings are formed varies depending on the season, the warming from black carbon varies seasonally as well.

Though this warming is weaker than the CO_{2}-induced warming or the cooling from sulfates, it can be regionally significant when black carbon is deposited over ice masses like mountain glaciers and the Greenland ice sheet. There, it reduces their albedo and increases their absorption of solar radiation, which accelerates their melting. Black carbon also has an outsized contribution to local warming inside polluted cities. Even the indirect effect of soot particles acting as cloud nuclei is not strong enough to provide cooling: the "brown clouds" formed around soot particles were known to have a net warming effect since the 2000s. Black carbon pollution is particularly strong over India: thus, it is considered to be one of the few regions where cleaning up air pollution would reduce, rather than increase, warming.

=== Minor role of aircraft contrails ===
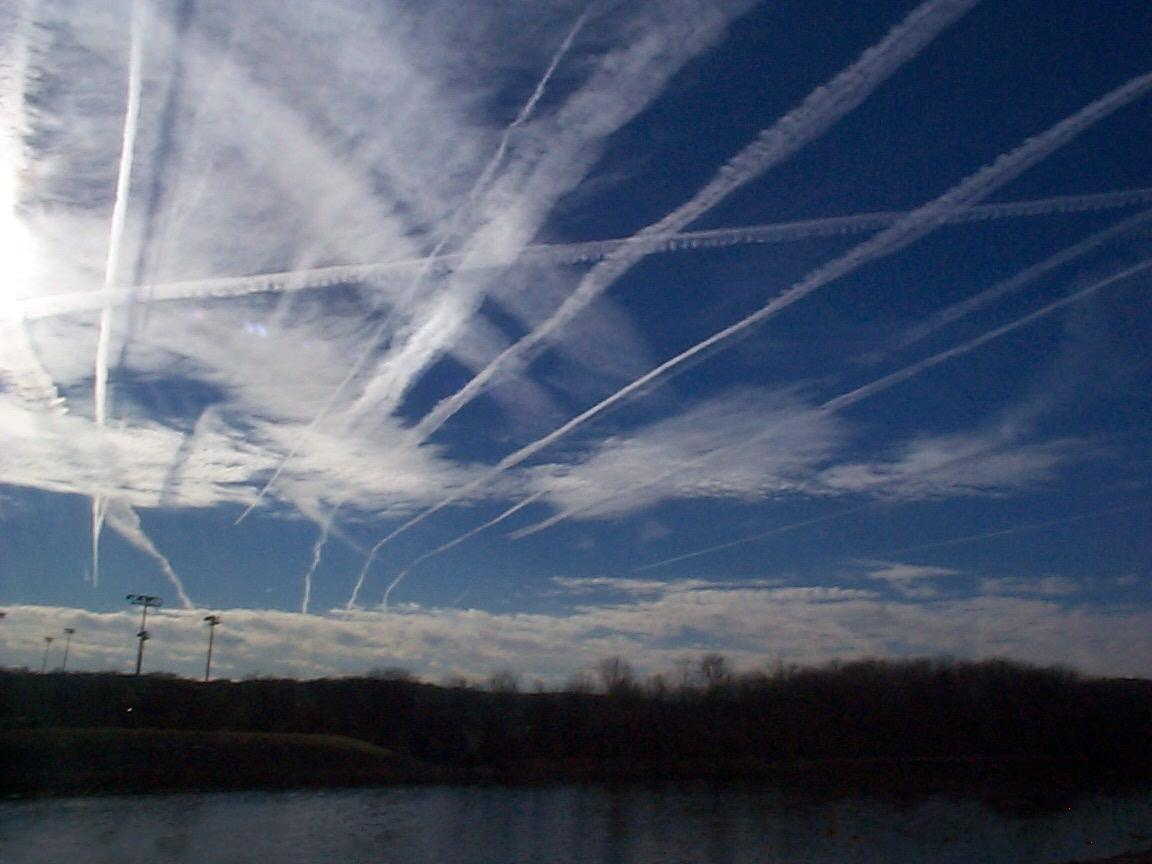
Aircraft contrails (white lines) and natural clouds.

Aircraft leave behind visible contrails (also known as vapor trails) as they travel. These contrails both reflect incoming solar radiation and trap outgoing longwave radiation that is emitted by the Earth. Because contrails reflect sunlight only during the day, but trap heat day and night, they are normally considered to cause net warming, albeit very small. A 1992 estimate was between 3.5 mW/m^{2} and 17 mW/m^{2} – hundreds of times smaller than the radiative forcing from major greenhouse gases.

However, some scientists argued that the daytime cooling effect from contrails was much stronger than usually estimated, and this argument attracted attention following the September 11 attacks. Because no commercial aircraft flew across the US in the immediate aftermath of the attacks, this period was considered a real-world demonstration of contrail-free weather. Across 4,000 weather stations in the continental United States, the diurnal temperature variation (the difference in the day's highs and lows at a fixed station) was widened by 1.1 °C (2.0 °F) – the largest recorded increase in 30 years. In the southern US, the difference was diminished by about 3.3 °C (6 °F), and by 2.8 °C (5 °F) in the US midwest. This was interpreted by some scientists as a proof of a strong cooling influence of aircraft contrails.

Ultimately, follow-up studies found that a natural change in cloud cover which occurred at the time was sufficient to explain these findings. When the global response to the 2020 coronavirus pandemic led to a reduction in global air traffic of nearly 70% relative to 2019, multiple studies found "no significant response of diurnal surface air temperature range" as the result of contrail changes, and either "no net significant global ERF" (effective radiative forcing) or a very small warming effect.

=== Historical cooling ===
This chart shows how much various physical factors affect climate change. For example, sulfur dioxide causes cooling because it reacts to form a variety of sunlight-reflecting sulfates. Its large error bar shows that there is a lot of uncertainty regarding the strength of cooling caused by sulfur dioxide in the atmosphere.

At the peak of global dimming, sulfur dioxide was able to counteract the warming trend completely. By 1975, the continually increasing concentrations of greenhouse gases had overcome the masking effect, and have dominated ever since. Even then, regions with high concentrations of sulfate aerosols due to air pollution had initially experienced cooling, in contradiction to the overall warming trend. The eastern United States was a prominent example: the temperatures there declined by 0.7 °C (1.3 °F) between 1970 and 1980, and by up to 1 °C (1.8 °F) in the Arkansas and Missouri.

=== Brightening and accelerated warming ===
Since the 1980s, the reduction in global dimming has contributed to higher global temperatures. Hot extremes have accelerated as global dimming has abated. It has been estimated that since the mid-1990s, peak daily temperatures in northeast Asia and hottest days of the year in Western Europe would have been substantially cooler if aerosol concentrations had stayed the same as before. Some of the acceleration of sea level rise, as well as Arctic amplification and the associated Arctic sea ice decline, was also attributed to the reduction in aerosol masking.

In Europe, the declines in aerosol concentrations since the 1980s had also reduced the associated fog, mist and haze: altogether, it was responsible for about 10–20% of daytime warming across Europe, and about 50% of the warming over the more polluted Eastern Europe. Because aerosol cooling depends on reflecting sunlight, air quality improvements had a negligible impact on wintertime temperatures, but had increased temperatures from April to September by around 1 °C (1.8 °F) in Central and Eastern Europe. The central and eastern United States experienced warming of 0.3 °C (0.54 °F) between 1980 and 2010 as sulfate pollution was reduced, even as sulfate particles still accounted for around 25% of all particulates. By 2021, the northeastern coast of the United States was one of the fastest-warming regions of North America, as the slowdown of the Atlantic Meridional Overturning Circulation increased temperatures in that part of the North Atlantic Ocean.

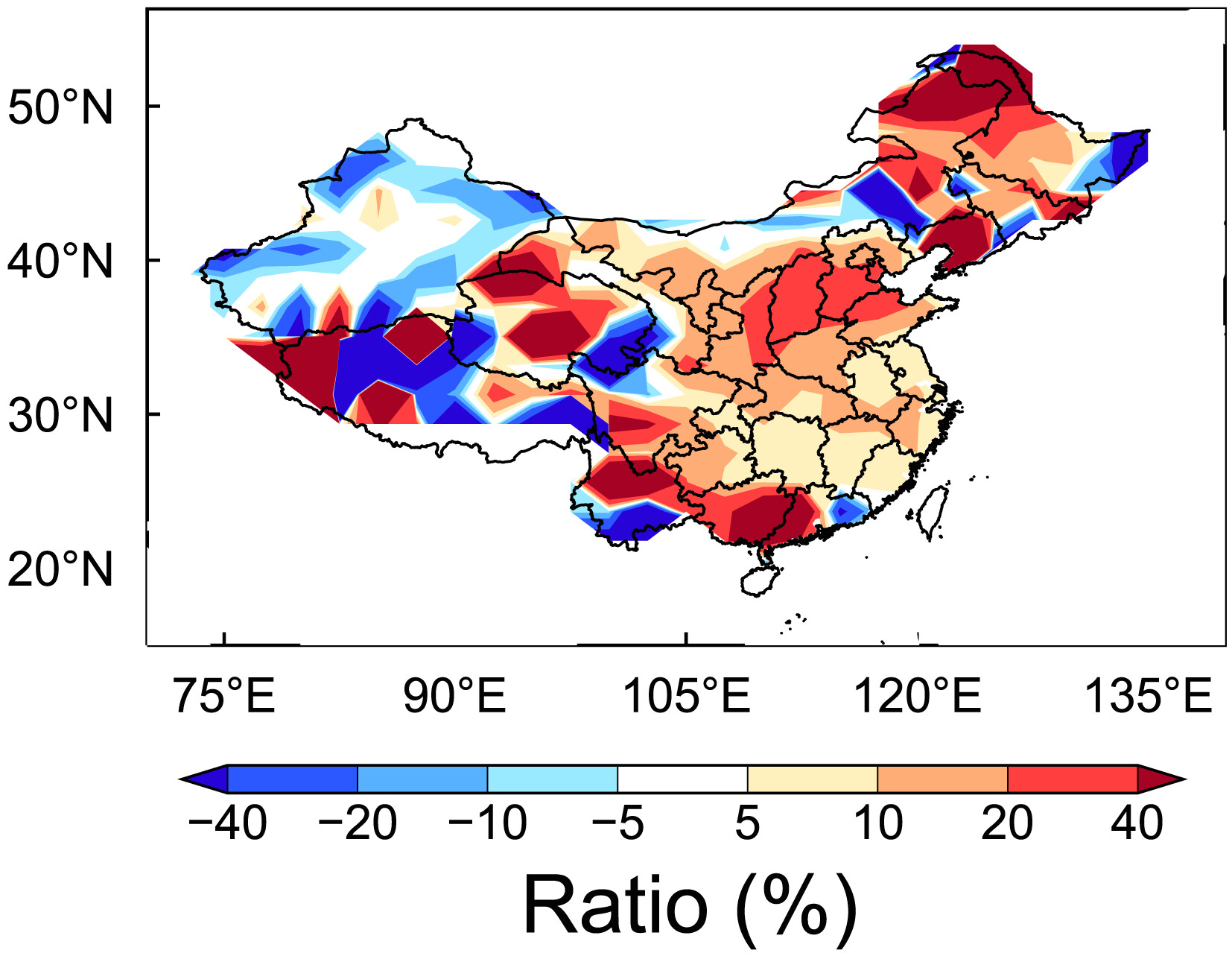
Rapid decline in air pollution caused by the COVID-19 lockdowns in China was responsible for up to 40% of the regional temperature changes in January–March 2020, relative to January–March 2019

In 2020, COVID-19 lockdowns provided a notable "natural experiment", as there had been a marked decline in sulfate and black carbon emissions caused by the curtailed road traffic and industrial output. That decline did have a detectable warming impact: it was estimated to have increased global temperatures by 0.01–0.02 °C (0.018–0.036 °F) initially and up to 0.03 °C (0.054 °F) by 2023, before disappearing. Regionally, the lockdowns were estimated to increase temperatures by 0.05–0.15 °C (0.090–0.270 °F) in eastern China over January–March, and then by 0.04–0.07 °C (0.072–0.126 °F) over Europe, eastern United States, and South Asia in March–May, with the peak impact of 0.3 °C (0.54 °F) in some regions of the United States and Russia. In the city of Wuhan, the urban heat island effect was found to have decreased by 0.24 °C (0.43 °F) at night and by 0.12 °C (0.22 °F) overall during the strictest lockdowns.

=== Future ===
Since changes in aerosol concentrations already have an impact on the global climate, they would necessarily influence future projections as well. In fact, it is impossible to fully estimate the warming impact of all greenhouse gases without accounting for the counteracting cooling from aerosols.

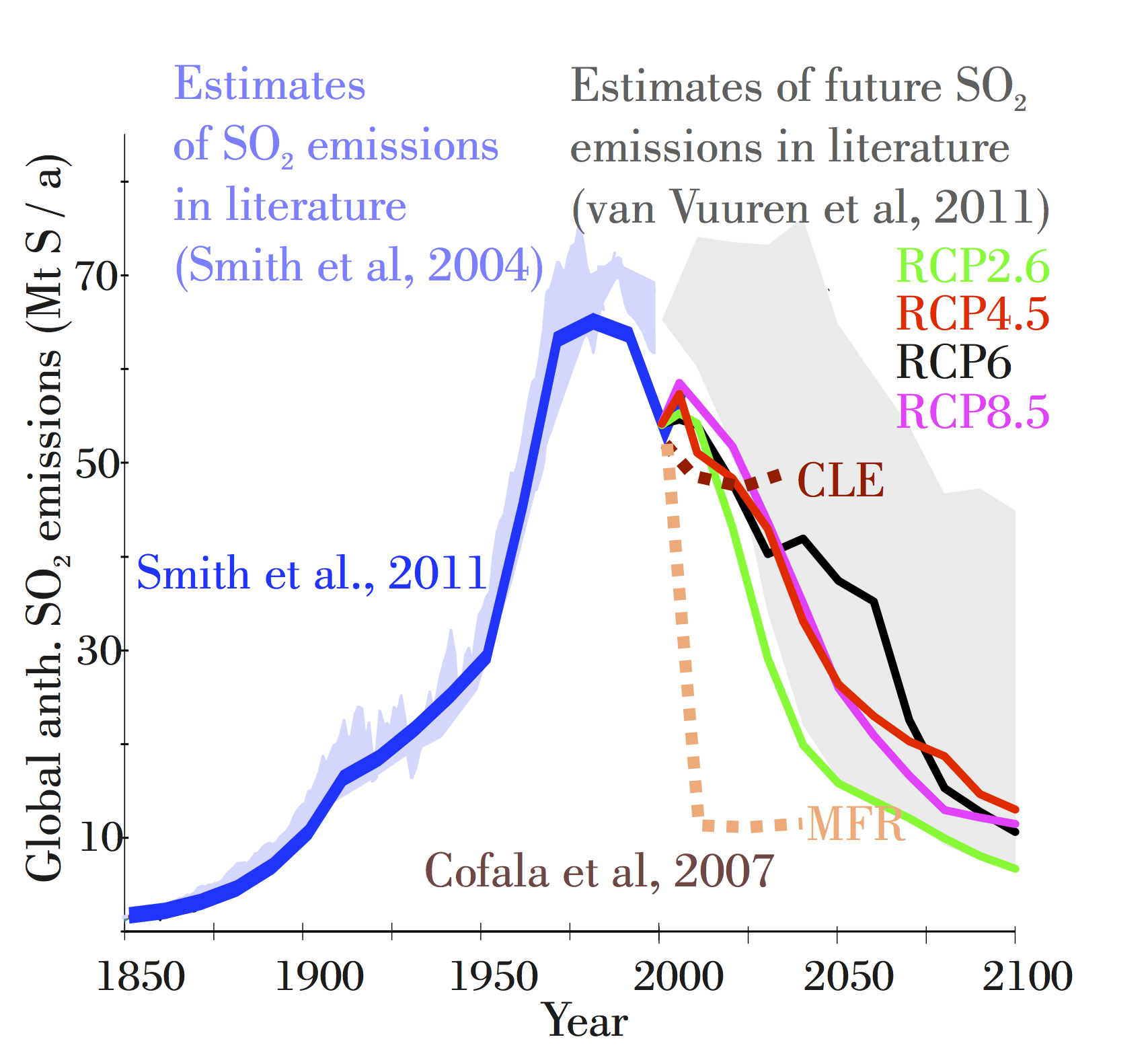
Early 2010s estimates of past and future anthropogenic global sulfur dioxide emissions, including the Representative Concentration Pathways. While no climate change scenario may reach Maximum Feasible Reductions (MFRs), all assume steep declines from today's levels. By 2019, sulfate emission reductions were confirmed to proceed at a very fast rate.

Climate models started to account for the effects of sulfate aerosols around the IPCC Second Assessment Report; when the IPCC Fourth Assessment Report was published in 2007, every climate model had integrated sulfates, but only 5 were able to account for less impactful particulates like black carbon. By 2021, CMIP6 models estimated total aerosol cooling in the range from 0.1 °C (0.18 °F) to 0.7 °C (1.3 °F); The IPCC Sixth Assessment Report selected the best estimate of a 0.5 °C (0.90 °F) cooling provided by sulfate aerosols, while black carbon amounts to about 0.1 °C (0.18 °F) of warming. While these values are based on combining model estimates with observational constraints, including those on ocean heat content, the matter is not yet fully settled. The difference between model estimates mainly stems from disagreements over the indirect effects of aerosols on clouds.

Regardless of the current strength of aerosol cooling, all future climate change scenarios project decreases in particulates and this includes the scenarios where 1.5 °C (2.7 °F) and 2 °C (3.6 °F) targets are met: their specific emission reduction targets assume the need to make up for lower dimming. Since models estimate that the cooling caused by sulfates is largely equivalent to the warming caused by atmospheric methane (and since methane is a relatively short-lived greenhouse gas), it is believed that simultaneous reductions in both would effectively cancel each other out. Yet, in the recent years, methane concentrations had been increasing at rates exceeding their previous period of peak growth in the 1980s, with wetland methane emissions driving much of the recent growth, while air pollution is getting cleaned up aggressively. These trends are some of the main reasons why 1.5 °C (2.7 °F) warming is now expected around 2030, as opposed to the mid-2010s estimates where it would not occur until 2040.

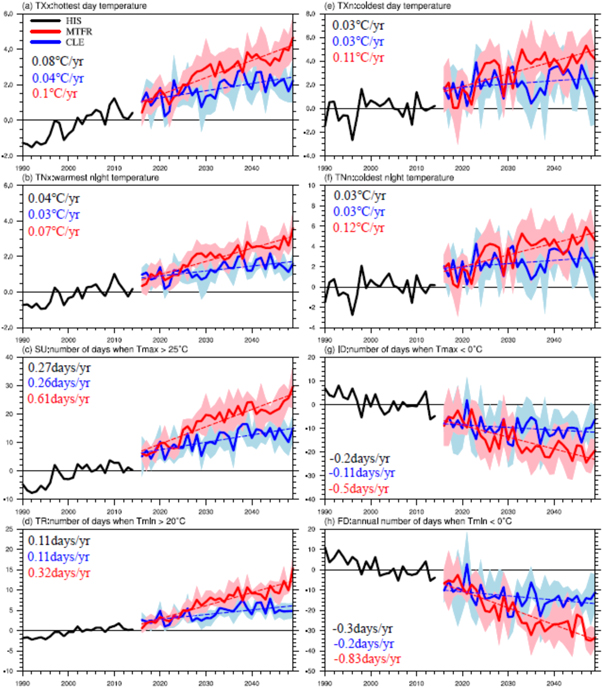
Addressing air pollution in Europe line with the current policies (blue line) is likely to increase the frequency of hot days and reduce the frequency of cold ones. Those increases will be even faster with maximum possible reductions (red line), unless the GHG emissions are addressed at the same rate. Similar trends will be seen in China

It has also been suggested that aerosols are not given sufficient attention in regional risk assessments, in spite of being more influential on a regional scale than globally. For instance, a climate change scenario with high greenhouse gas emissions but strong reductions in air pollution would see 0.2 °C (0.36 °F) more global warming by 2050 than the same scenario with little improvement in air quality, but regionally, the difference would add 5 more tropical nights per year in northern China and substantially increase precipitation in northern China and northern India. Likewise, a paper comparing current level of clean air policies with a hypothetical maximum technically feasible action under otherwise the same climate change scenario found that the latter would increase the risk of temperature extremes by 30–50% in China and in Europe.

Unfortunately, because historical records of aerosols are sparser in some regions than in others, accurate regional projections of aerosol impacts are difficult. Even the latest CMIP6 climate models can only accurately represent aerosol trends over Europe, but struggle with representing North America and Asia. This means that their near-future projections of regional impacts are likely to contain errors as well.

== Relationship with water cycle ==
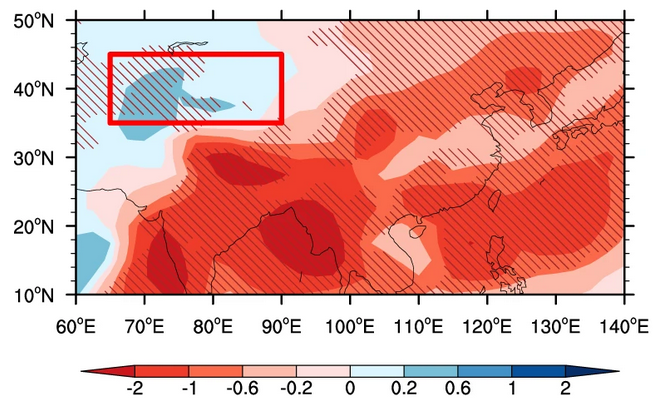
Sulfate aerosols have decreased precipitation over most of Asia (red), but increased it over some parts of Central Asia (blue).

On regional and global scale, air pollution can affect the water cycle, in a manner similar to some natural processes. One example is the impact of Sahara dust on hurricane formation: air laden with sand and mineral particles moves over the Atlantic Ocean, where they block some of the sunlight from reaching the water surface, slightly cooling it and dampening the development of hurricanes. Likewise, it has been suggested since the early 2000s that since aerosols decrease solar radiation over the ocean and hence reduce evaporation from it, they would be "spinning down the hydrological cycle of the planet."

In 2011, it was found that anthropogenic aerosols had been the predominant factor behind 20th century changes in rainfall over the Atlantic Ocean sector, when the entire tropical rain belt shifted southwards between 1950 and 1985, with a limited northwards shift afterwards. Future reductions in aerosol emissions are expected to result in a more rapid northwards shift, with limited impact in the Atlantic but a substantially greater impact in the Pacific. Some research also suggests that these reductions would affect the AMOC (already expected to weaken due to climate change). Reductions from the stronger air quality policies could exacerbate this expected decline by around 10%, unless methane emissions are reduced by an equivalent amount.

Most notably, multiple studies connect aerosols from the Northern Hemisphere to the failed monsoon in sub-Saharan Africa during the 1970s and 1980s, which then led to the Sahel drought and the associated famine. However, model simulations of Sahel climate are very inconsistent, so it's difficult to prove that the drought would not have occurred without aerosol pollution, although it would have clearly been less severe. Some research indicates that those models which demonstrate warming alone driving strong precipitation increases in the Sahel are the most accurate, making it more likely that sulfate pollution was to blame for overpowering this response and sending the region into drought.

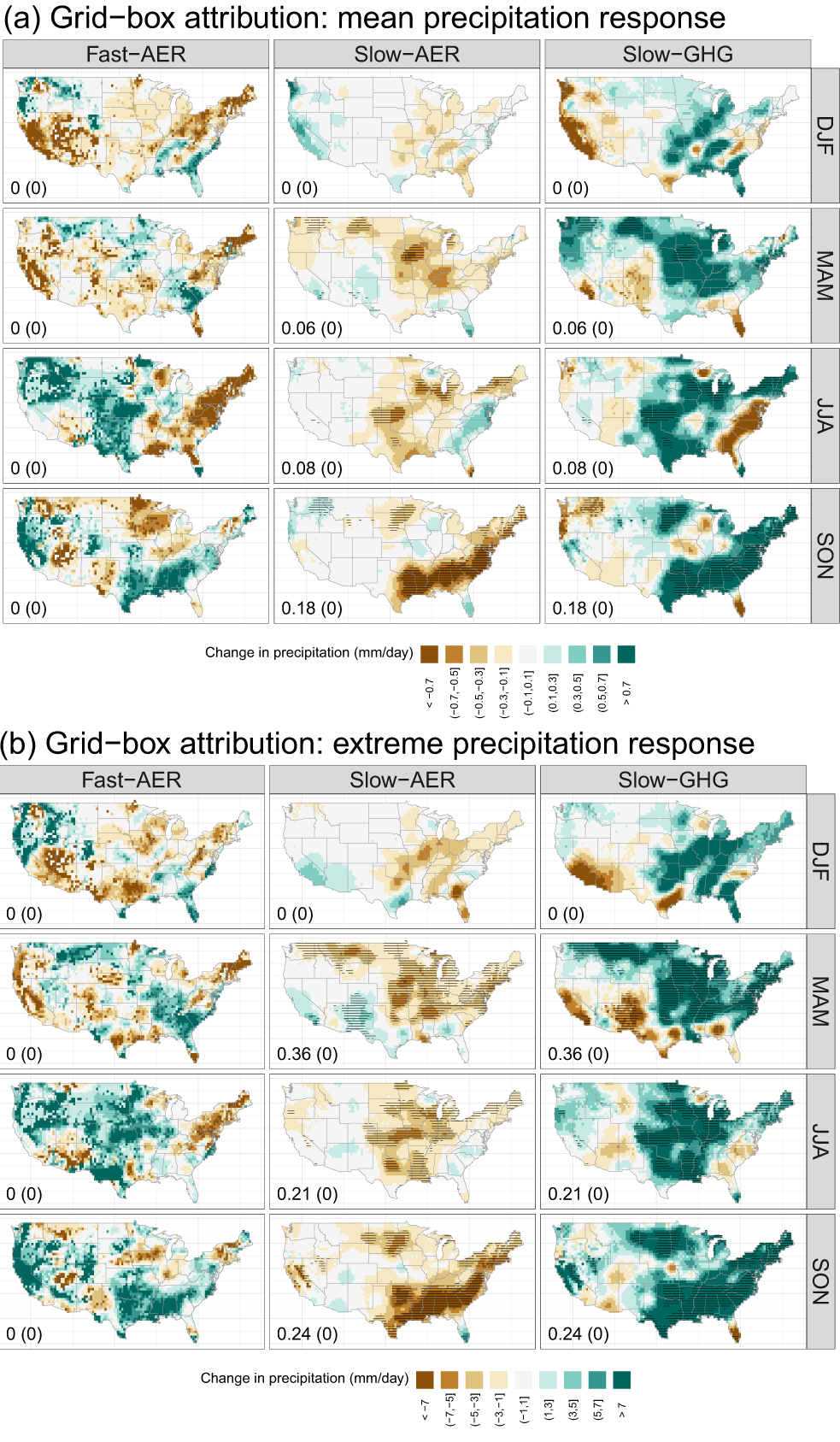
In the United States, aerosols generally reduce both mean and extreme precipitation across all four seasons, which has cancelled out the increases caused by greenhouse gas warming

Another dramatic finding had connected the impact of aerosols with the weakening of the Monsoon of South Asia. It was first advanced in 2006, yet it also remained difficult to prove. In particular, some research suggested that warming itself increases the risk of monsoon failure, potentially pushing it past a tipping point. By 2021, however, it was concluded that global warming consistently strengthened the monsoon, and some strengthening was already observed in the aftermath of lockdown-caused aerosol reductions.

In 2009, an analysis of 50 years of data found that light rains had decreased over eastern China, even though there was no significant change in the amount of water held by the atmosphere. This was attributed to aerosols reducing droplet size within clouds, which led to those clouds retaining water for a longer time without raining. The phenomenon of aerosols suppressing rainfall through reducing cloud droplet size has been confirmed by subsequent studies. Later research found that aerosol pollution over South and East Asia didn't just suppress rainfall there, but also resulted in more moisture transferred to Central Asia, where summer rainfall had increased as the result. In the United States, effects of climate change on the water cycle would typically increase both mean and extreme precipitation across the country, but these effects have so far been "masked" by the drying due to historically strong aerosol concentrations. The IPCC Sixth Assessment Report had also linked changes in aerosol concentrations to altered precipitation in the Mediterranean region.

== Relevance for solar geoengineering ==
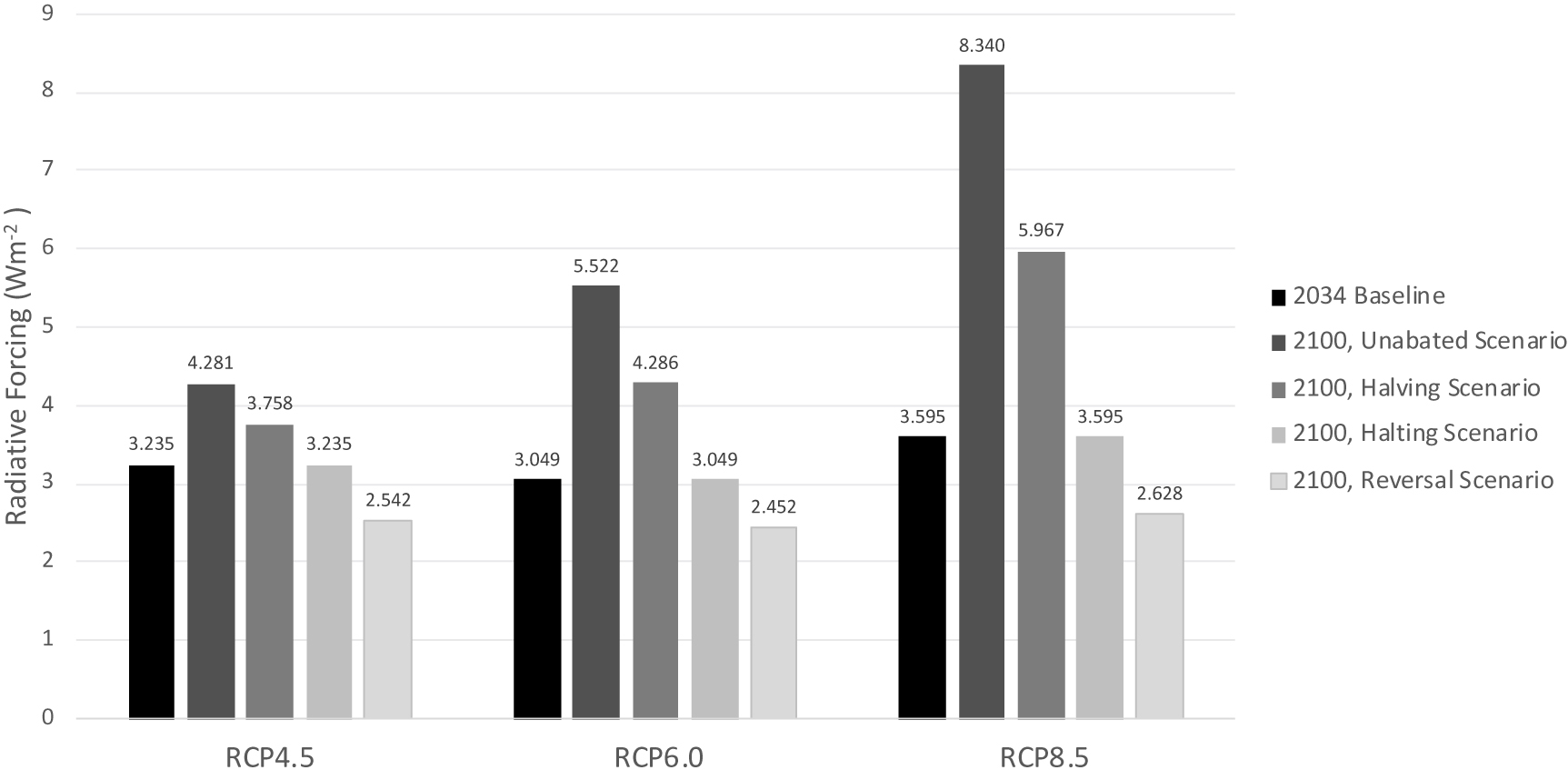
This graph shows that if stratospheric aerosol injection were to be deployed starting from 2034, then it could be finely scaled to either halve the speed of warming by 2100, to halt it, or to reverse it entirely. The same degree of control is available under the scenarios of low, medium and high greenhouse gas emissions

Global dimming is also relevant for certain proposals about slowing, halting, or reversing global warming. An increase in planetary albedo of 1% would eliminate most of radiative forcing from anthropogenic greenhouse gas emissions and thereby global warming, while a 2% albedo increase would negate the warming effect of doubling the atmospheric carbon dioxide concentration. This is the theory behind solar radiation modification (or solar geoengineering), and the high reflective potential of sulfate aerosols means that they were considered in this capacity starting from the 1970s.

Because the historical levels of global dimming were associated with high mortality from air pollution and issues such as acid rain, the concept of relying on cooling directly from pollution has been described as a "Faustian bargain" and is not seriously considered by modern research. Instead, the seminal 2006 paper by Paul Crutzen suggested that the way to avoid increased warming as the sulfate pollution decreased was to revisit the 1974 proposal by the Soviet researcher Mikhail Budyko. The proposal involved releasing sulfates from the airplanes flying in the upper layers of the atmosphere, in what is now described as stratospheric aerosol injection, or SAI. In comparison, most air pollution is in the lower atmospheric layer (the troposphere), and only resides there for weeks. Because aerosols deposited in the stratosphere would last for years, far less sulfur would have to be emitted to produce the same amount of cooling.

While Crutzen's initial proposal focused on avoiding the warming caused by the reductions in air pollution, it was immediately understood that scaling up this proposal could slow, stop, or reverse warming. It has been estimated that the amount of sulfur needed to offset a warming of around 4 °C (7.2 °F) relative to now (and 5 °C (9.0 °F) relative to the preindustrial), under the highest-emission scenario RCP 8.5 would be less than what is already emitted through air pollution today, and that reductions in sulfur pollution from future air quality improvements already expected under that scenario would offset the sulfur used for geoengineering. The trade-off is increased cost. Although there's a popular narrative that stratospheric aerosol injection can be carried out by individuals, small states, or other non-state rogue actors, scientific estimates suggest that cooling the atmosphere by 1 °C (1.8 °F) through stratospheric aerosol injection would cost at least $18 billion annually (at 2020 USD value), meaning that only the largest economies or economic blocs could afford this intervention. Even so, these approaches would still be "orders of magnitude" cheaper than greenhouse gas mitigation, let alone the costs of unmitigated effects of climate change.

Even if SAI were to stop or outright reverse global warming, weather patterns in many areas would still change substantially. The habitat of mosquitoes and other disease vectors would shift. However, it's unclear how it would compare to the shifts that are otherwise likely to occur from climate change. Lower sunlight would affect crop yields and carbon sinks due to reduced photosynthesis, but this would likely be offset by lack of thermal stress from warming and the greater CO_{2} fertilization effect relative to now. Most importantly, the warming from CO_{2} emissions lasts for hundreds to thousands of years, while the cooling from SAI stops 1–3 years after the last aerosol injection. This means that neither stratospheric aerosol injection nor other forms of solar geoengineering can be used as a substitute for reducing greenhouse gas emissions. In contrast, if greenhouse gas levels remained high, it would lead to "large and extremely rapid" warming and similarly abrupt changes to the water cycle. Many thousands of species would likely go extinct as a result. Instead, any solar geoengineering would act as a temporary measure to limit warming. At the same time, emissions of greenhouse gases are reduced and carbon dioxide is removed, which may well take hundreds of years.

== See also ==
- Global cooling – Discredited 1970s hypothesis of imminent cooling of the Earth
- Global stilling – Observed decrease in wind speed near Earth's surface since the 1980s
- Impact winter – Hypothesized climate effects due to an asteroid or comet impact on Earth
- Nuclear winter – Hypothetical climatic effect of nuclear war
- Volcanic winter – Temperature anomaly event caused by a volcanic eruption
- Pyranometer – Instrument for measuring solar irradiance
- Ship tracks – Clouds that form around the exhaust released by ships
- Sunshine recorders – Meteorological instrumentation
