= Stilling =

Stilling is a surname. Notable people with the surname include:

- Benedict Stilling (1810–1879), German anatomist and surgeon
- Harald Conrad Stilling (1815–1891), Danish architect
- Jakob Stilling (1842–1915), German ophthalmologist

== See also ==
- Viggo Stilling-Andersen (1893–1967), Danish fencer
- Stillings
- Global terrestrial stilling
