= Højen 13 =

Listed villa in Aarhus, Denmark

Coordinates: 56.1572°N 10.1113°E

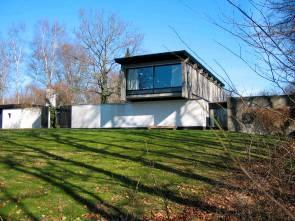
- Knud Friis' house Højen 13
- Interactive map of the Højen 13 area

General information
- Architectural style: Brutalism
- Location: Aarhus, Denmark
- Completed: 1958

Technical details
- Floor count: 2

Design and construction
- Architect: Knud Friis

Højen 13 is a villa and listed building in Aarhus, Denmark. The villa was built in 1958 and was listed in the Danish registry of protected buildings and places by the Danish Heritage Agency on 11 January 2008. The house was built by the architect Knud Friis as his home and study on a hill overlooking Brabrand Lake in the Brabrand suburb.

Knud Friis owned the architect firm Friis & Moltke with his partner Elmar Moltke and they collaborated on most of their projects including their private residences in the Aarhus area. In 1957 Knud Friis and his wife bought a 3000 m2 parcel of land on top of a hill overlooking Brabrand Lake and decided to build their new home there. The original house was built in 1958 and consisted of two parallel wings oriented north to south and connected by two walls that isolates a paved courtyard between the structures. The structure of the main building is formed by the two white garden walls which carry the 1st floor concrete walls which appear like free hanging beams along the width of the garden.

The main building is in two floors with kitchen, dining room, bath and guest rooms on the ground floor while the living room, bedroom and study were on the 1st floor while the other wing contained the garage and shed. In 1970 the villa was expanded with a third partially submerged wing to the east, separated from the main building by a skylight column. Most rooms were moved to this new wing leaving more space for other activities in the main building.

The villa is an example of brutalist architecture. The walls are of raw concrete with visible marks from formwork boards, the doors and windows are very noticeable and kept in blue and the floors are paved with rock or linoleum. The raw appearance is appeased by the hilly and lush surroundings high above the lake.

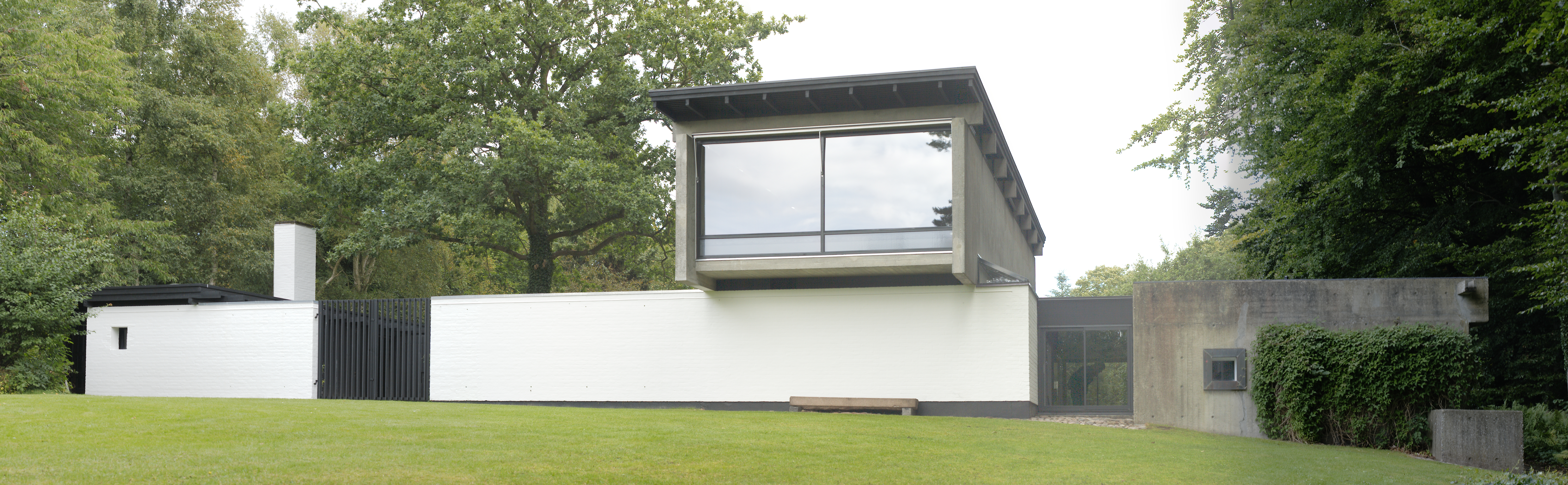

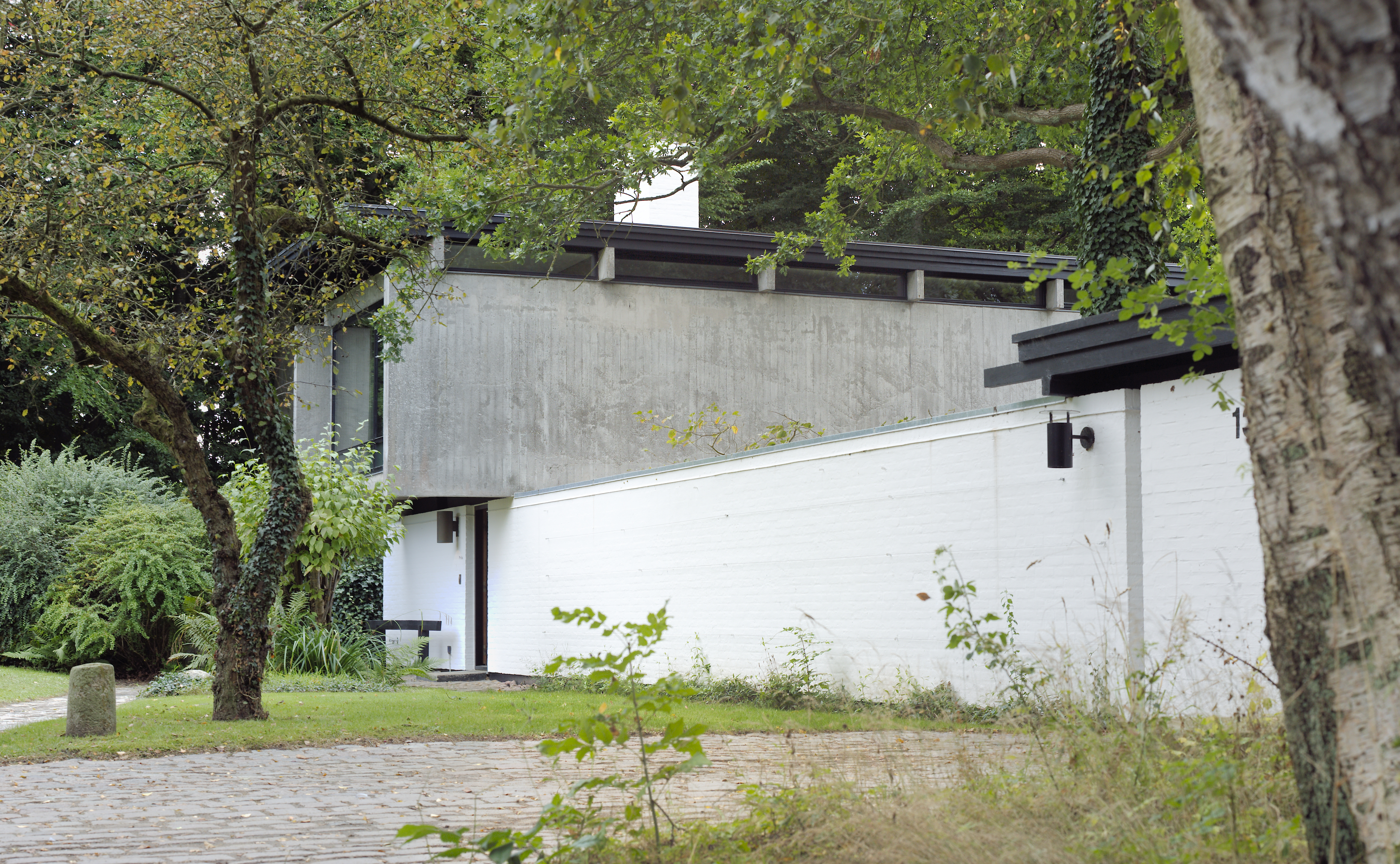

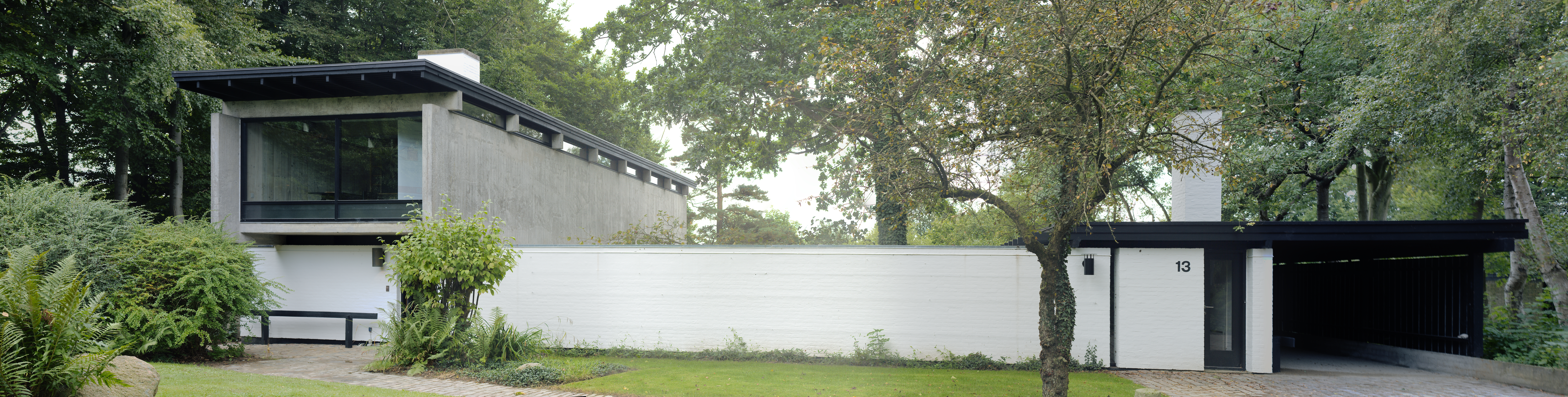
