= Onion Creek Bridge (Coffeyville, Kansas) =

Bridge in Kansas, U.S.

- U.S. National Register of Historic Places
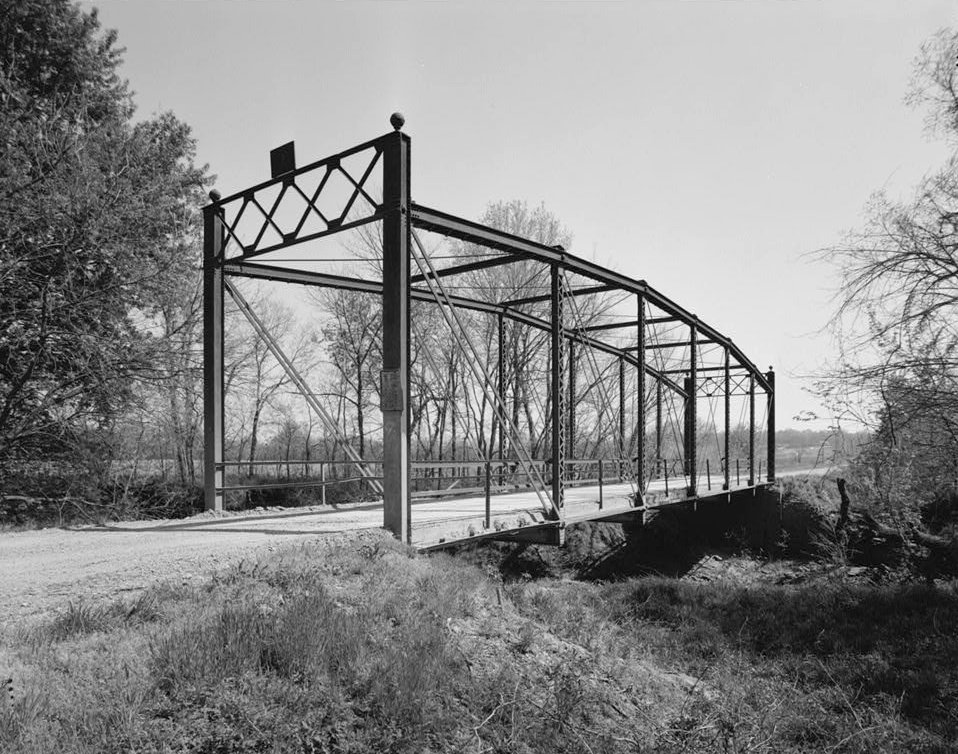

- Location within Kansas Location within the United States
- Nearest city: Coffeyville, Kansas
- Coordinates: 37°1′33″N 95°39′23″W
- Area: less than one acre
- Built: 1911
- Built by: Western Bridge Co.
- Architectural style: Parker truss
- MPS: Metal Truss Bridges in Kansas 1861--1939 MPS
- NRHP reference No.: 89002172
- Added to NRHP: January 4, 1990

The Onion Creek Bridge was built in 1911 near Coffeyville, Kansas. The pin-connected steel Parker through-truss bridge is 104 feet (32 m) long. It is unusual in possessing vertical end posts, one of only two such bridges in Kansas. The bridge retains its design integrity.

The Onion Creek Bridge was placed on the National Register of Historic Places in 1990.

== See also ==
- List of bridges documented by the Historic American Engineering Record in Kansas
