= Global terrestrial stilling =

Observed decrease in wind speed near Earth's surface since the 1980s

Global terrestrial stilling is the general decrease of wind speeds observed near the Earth's surface between the 1980s and the 2010s, originally termed "stilling". This slowdown of near-surface terrestrial winds has mainly affected mid-latitude regions of both hemispheres, with a global average reduction of −0.140 m s^{−1} dec^{−1} (meters per second per decade), or between 5 and 15%, over the past 50 years. High-latitude regions (>75° from the equator) in both hemispheres, on the other hand, have shown increases in mean wind speeds. Additionally, in contrast to the observed weakening of winds over continental surfaces, winds have correspondingly tended to strengthen over ocean regions. There has been a (partial) reversal of the trend since around 2010.

The exact cause(s) of the global terrestrial stilling remain uncertain, but the phenomenon has been mainly attributed to two major drivers: (i) changes in large-scale atmospheric circulation, and (ii) an increase of surface roughness due to e.g. forest growth, land use changes, and urbanization.

Given climate change, changes in wind speed are currently a potential concern for society, due to their impacts on a wide array of spheres, such as wind power generation, ecohydrological implications for agriculture and hydrology, wind-related hazards and catastrophes, and air quality and human health, among many others.

== Causes ==
Attribution of the observed weakening of terrestrial near-surface wind speeds is not conclusive, probably because of several factors which interact simultaneously and may change in space and time. Scientists have proposed various major causes influencing the observed reduction:

1. A general increase in land-surface roughness during the late 20th century (due to factors such as the growth and expansion of forests, large-scale changes in land use, and the expansion of man-made environments that accompanies increased urbanization), especially near meteorological stations where anemometers measure wind speeds, has reinforced surface friction forces, acting as windbreaks that disrupt and redirect the otherwise laminar flows of many low-level winds.
1. An increased variability in large-scale atmospheric circulation due to global warming, associated with the poleward expansion of the Hadley cell and the shifting of centers of action (i.e. anticyclones and cyclones) controlling changes in near-surface wind speed.
1. Changes in how wind speed is measured, including the deterioration or instrumental drift of anemometer devices, the technological improvement of anemometers, anemometer height changes, shifts in which locations are perceived as optimal measurement sites, changes in the environment around the monitoring station, calibration issues, and measuring time intervals.
1. "Global dimming", i.e., the observed decrease in the amount of solar radiation reaching the Earth's surface due to increased concentrations of aerosols and greenhouse gases in the atmosphere, which has forced a general stabilization of the atmosphere that has resulted in weak winds.
1. Various other causes, such as increasing trends in available soil moisture and astronomical changes, have also been put forward.

However, the precise causes of global terrestrial stilling and their relative contributions are still unresolved because of the many uncertainties behind this phenomenon across the world.

== Uncertainties ==
A critical clue to understanding global terrestrial stilling may be the observation that it does not appear to be affecting both land and ocean surfaces in the same ways. Spatially, increasing wind speed trends have been reported for some regions, particularly for high-latitude, coastal and ocean surfaces, where different authors have reported not a decrease but an increase in global wind speed trends using satellite measurements from the last 30–40 years. Additionally, recent studies have shown a break in the negative tendency of terrestrial wind speeds recorded between the 1980s and 2010s, with a recent widespread recovery/strengthening of wind speeds since around 2013. This creates uncertainty in understanding the phenomenon.

Most of the uncertainties behind the global terrestrial stilling debate reside in (i) the short wind speed data availability, with series only starting in the 1960s, and (ii) a bias in the predominance of wind speed studies carried out in mid-latitude regions, where the majority of long-term measurements are available; and (iii) the low quality of anemometer records as pointed out by the Fifth Assessment Report (AR5) of the Intergovernmental Panel on Climate Change (IPCC).

The low quality of wind speed series is mainly due to non-climatic factors (e.g. changes in observational practices, station relocation, anemometer height changes) affecting those records, which cause the measured wind speeds to be unrepresentative of actual wind speed variations over time. Specific homogenization protocols for wind speed series have been developed in order to detect and adjust potential inhomogeneities.

== Ongoing research ==
The current research on assessing and attributing this phenomenon has focused on reducing the limitation of short availability and low quality of wind speed data. The European funded research project STILLING is a current (2016–2018) initiative that aims to reduce this constraint by rescuing, homogenizing and recovering the longest and highest-quality wind speed series across the globe. The project is currently compiling wind speed records starting in the 1880s providing scientists with approximately 130-year records, roughly 80 years more than previous studies available in the scientific literature. The better knowledge of the past wind speed climate is crucial for understanding the present "global terrestrial stilling" phenomenon, detecting if climate change is behind this slowdown of wind or similar trends-cycles occurred in the past and could be expected for the future. That is with longer records decadal cycles may be detected.

== Implications of wind speed changes ==
The global terrestrial stilling phenomenon is of great scientific, socioeconomic, and environmental interest because of the key impact of even small wind speed changes on atmospheric and ocean dynamics and related fields such as: (i) renewable wind energy; (ii) agriculture and hydrology due to evapotranspiration; (iii) migration of wind-dispersed plant species; (iv) wind-related natural disasters; (v) marine and coastal impacts due to wind-driven storm surges and waves; (vi) dispersion of air pollutants; among many other socioeconomic and environmental spheres. However, for wind energy near-surface wind speeds are mainly observed within 10m of the land surface, and with turbines being located some 60–80 m above the land surface more studies are needed here. More studies are also needed at higher elevation sites, which are often areas that yield much of our freshwater supplies, called water-towers, as wind speeds there have been shown to be decreasing more rapidly than those changes recorded at lower elevation sites. There are several Chinese papers showing this for the Tibetan Plateau in particular.

== See also ==
- Anemometer
- Climate change
- Causes of climate change
- Ozone depletion
