= Stillings, Missouri =

Unincorporated community in Missouri, U.S.

Coordinates: 39°19′11″N 94°53′17″W

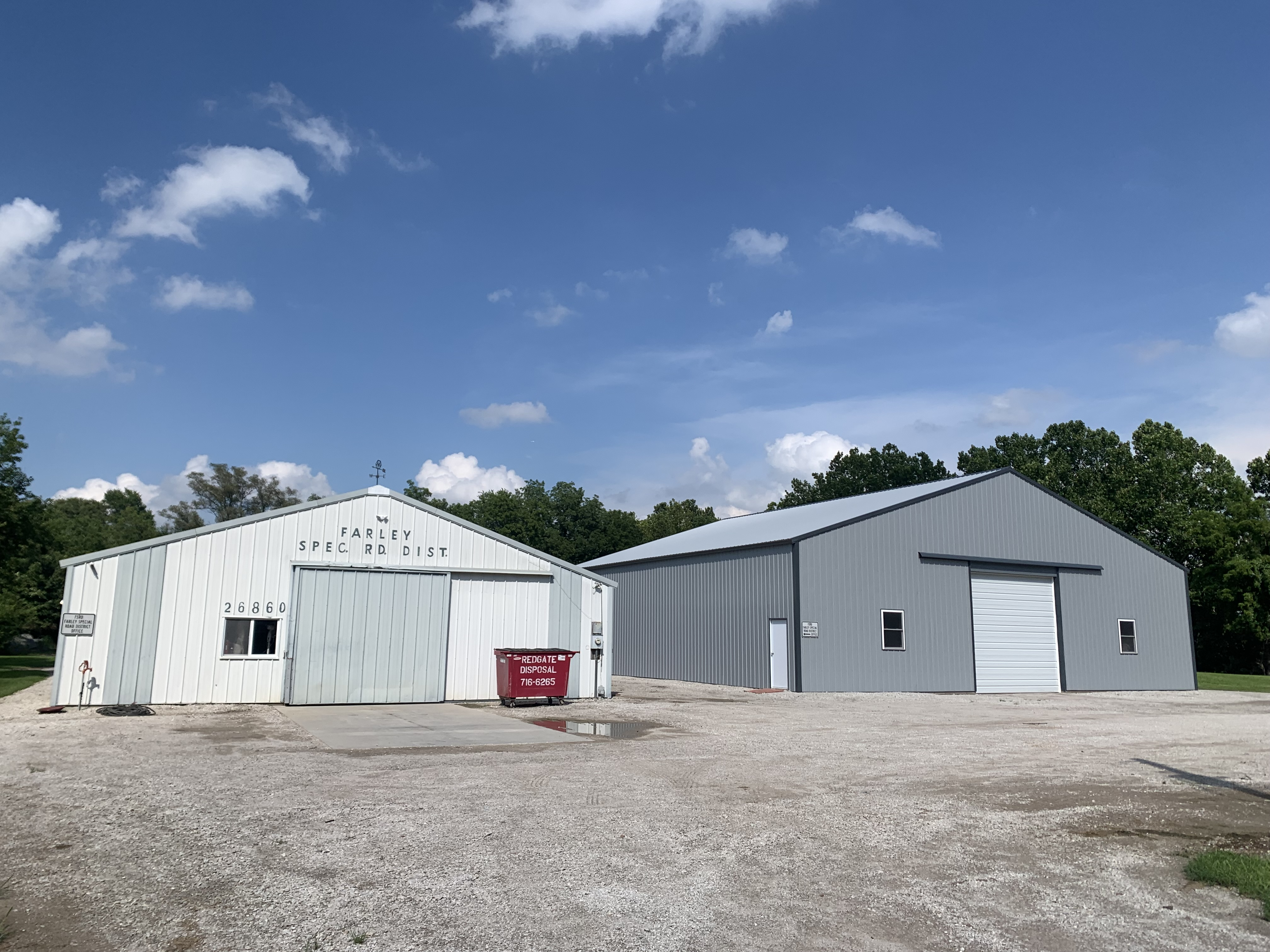
Farley Special Road District building at Stillings, Missouri in Lee Township.

Stillings is an unincorporated community in Platte County, in the U.S. state of Missouri. It lies within the Kansas City metropolitan area.

== History ==
Stillings was laid out in 1889 by Vinton Stillings, and named for him. A post office was established at Stillings in 1890, and remained in operation until 1913.

== Geography ==
Stilings is located across the Missouri River from Leavenworth, Kansas, specifically on the railroad that formerly crossed at the Terminal Bridge. It is located at Leavenworth Island in western Lee Township, southwest of the former Duck Lake and northwest of Farley, Missouri.
