= Jamey Stillings =

American photographer and artist

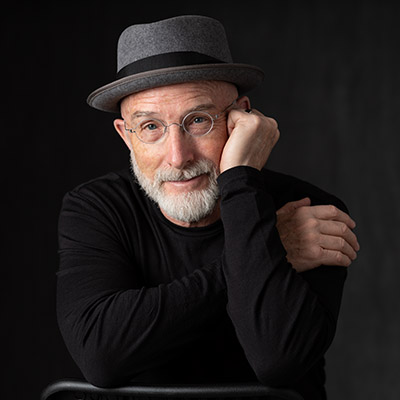
Jamey Stillings, photographer

Jamey Stillings (born in 1955) is an American photographer and artist known primarily for his aerial photography of renewable energy projects around the world, documenting the human impact on the environment. Stillings presents at photo festivals, universities, and professional conferences globally. His work is exhibited and published widely in Asia, Australia, Europe, and North and South America. His award-winning book, The Evolution of Ivanpah Solar (Steidl, 2015), documents the Ivanpah Solar Power Facility in the Mojave Desert of California. His photographs are in private and public collections, including the United States Library of Congress, the Museum of Fine Arts - Houston, the Los Angeles County Museum of Art, and the Nevada Museum of Art.

Since 2010, Jamey Stillings' has focused on renewable energy through an aerial project entitled Changing Perspectives: Renewable Energy and the Shifting Human Landscape. He has photographed extensively over the United States, Japan, Uruguay, and Chile from helicopters and light airplanes.

== Education ==
Jamey Stillings earned a BA in art from Willamette University, magna cum laude (1978), and an MFA in Photography from Rochester Institute of Technology (1982). His documentary master's thesis, Nicaragua: A Society in Transition (1980–81), examined social and economic changes in three rural Nicaraguan communities following the Sandinista revolution.

== Major photographic projects ==
- The Bridge at Hoover Dam Stillings documented the construction of the Mike O’Callaghan—Pat Tillman Memorial Bridge, downstream from Hoover Dam, unique for its historical importance and its technical achievement. Over a two-year period, Stillings returned to document the Bridge sixteen times. A monograph of the work, The Bridge at Hoover Dam, was published by Nazraeli Press in 2011.
- The Evolution of Ivanpah Solar Over a period of four years, Stillings did aerial photography documenting the construction of the Ivanpah Solar Electric Generating System in the Mojave Desert of California. When completed in 2014, this facility was the world's largest concentrated solar thermal power plant. A monograph of the work, The Evolution of Ivanpah Solar, was published by Steidl in 2015.
- Changing Perspectives: Renewable Energy and the Shifting Human Landscape is Stillings’ long-term project. He has extensively documented renewable energy development in the American West, Japan, Uruguay and Chile.The work has been internationally exhibited, published and collected.
- Atacama: Renewable Energy and Mining in the High Desert of Chile examines the evolving nexus between renewable energy development and mining in the Atacama Desert of Chile, part of Stillings’ larger Changing Perspectives project. In 2017, Stillings documented new renewable energy projects in the Atacama that are reducing mining's dependence on fossil fuels while supplying significant electricity to the northern grid and transmitting power to population centers in the south. ATACAMA explores utility-scale renewable energy projects including solar power, enormous mining operations, and the stark beauty of the Atacama Desert. A monograph of the work was published by Steidl in 2023.

== Publications ==
- The Bridge at Hoover Dam, Nazraeli Press, 2011, ISBN 978-1-59005-331-7, essays by William L. Fox and Jamey Stillings
- The Evolution of Ivanpah Solar, Steidl, Göttingen, Germany, 2015, ISBN 978-3-86930-913-2. With foreword by Robert Redford, introduction by Anne Wilkes Tucker, essays by Bruce Barcott and Jamey Stillings
- Stillings, Jamey; Missana, Sergio (2023). Atacama: renewable energy and mining in the high desert of Chile (First ed.). Göttingen, Germany: Steidl. ISBN 9783958297081.

== Selected editorial publications ==
- The New York Times Magazine, “Bridge to Somewhere,” June 2009
- Smithsonian Magazine, “A Breathtaking New Bridge,” December 2010
- The New York Times Magazine, "A Bet on the Sun," June 17, 2012
- Newsweek Japan, "Picture Power: The Evolution of Ivanpah Solar," December 2012
- NPR, The Picture Show, "Under Construction: The World's Largest Thermal Solar Plant," January 9, 2013
- TIME Magazine, "Power Surge," October 2013
- TIME Magazine, "A Burst of Energy," March 2015
- Macleans, "Photo essay: Capturing the Sun," Canada, November 23, 2015, p. 47 (5 pgs)
- National Geographic, "A Blueprint for a Carbon-Free America," November 2015
- New Republic, "The Beauty of the World’s Largest Solar Project," December 4, 2015
- WIRED Italia, "Riflessi Solari," Italy, March 3, 2016
- National Geographic, "The Art of Solar Energy," June 2016
- Bloomberg, “Japan’s Renewable-Energy Revolution,” July 2017
- Bloomberg Businessweek, “The Renewable Desert,” August 2018
- Photoworld, “Jamey Stillings: Documenting Renewable Energy Development from the Air,” China, June 2020

== Collections ==
Jamey Stillings’ work is in the permanent collections of the U.S. Library of Congress; Museum of Fine Arts, Houston; Los Angeles County Museum of Art (LACMA); Nevada Museum of Art, Center for Art + Environment; UNLV University Libraries Special Collections & Archives; University of Arizona, Center for Creative Photography; Middlebury College Museum of Art; and Stanford University Libraries Special Collections & University Archives

== Selected exhibitions ==
- photo-eye Gallery, “The Bridge at Hoover Dam,” Premier Exhibition, Santa Fe, NM, 2009
- Etherton Gallery, “Con-struct: The New West,” three artist exhibition, Tucson, AZ, 2010
- Springs Preserve, “The Bridge at Hoover Dam,” Las Vegas, NV, 2010
- Phoenix Art Museum, “The Bridge at Hoover Dam,” Phoenix, AZ, 2011
- photo-eye Gallery, "The Bridge at Hoover Dam," Santa Fe, NM, 2011
- Blue Sky Gallery, "The Bridge at Hoover Dam," Portland, OR, 2012
- PhotoVisa, "The Bridge at Hoover Dam," Solo Exhibition, Krasnodar, Russia, 2014
- Center for Fine Art Photography, "The Evolution of Ivanpah Solar," Solo Exhibition, curated by Hamidah Glasgow Ft. Collins, CO, 2014
- Festival de la Luz, "La Evolución de Ivanpah Solar," Buenos Aires, Argentina, 2014
- Etherton Gallery, "The Evolution of Ivanpah Solar," Tucson, AZ, 2014-15
- UN Climate Change Legacy Exhibition, COP21, group exhibition, Paris, 2015
- Lianzhou Foto Festival 2015, "The Evolution of Ivanpah Solar," Solo Exhibition, Lianzhou, China
- Dishman Art Museum, Lamar University, “Jamey Stillings: The Evolution of Ivanpah Solar,” Beaumont, TX, 2016
- Mt. Rokko International Photo Festival, "The Evolution of Ivanpah Solar," Solo Exhibition, Kobe, Japan, 2016
- FotoFest 2016 Biennial, Changing Circumstances: Looking at the Future of the Planet, Featured Artist, Group Exhibition, curated by Wendy Watriss, Fred Baldwin, and Steven Evans, Houston, TX, 2016
- Pingyao International Photography Festival 2017, "Changing Perspectives: Renewable Energy and Infrastructure," Solo Exhibition, Pingyao, China
- Festival de la Luz, “Changing Perspectives: Renewable Energy and the Shifting Human Landscape,” Buenos Aires, Argentina, 2018
- Head On Photo Festival 2018, "Changing Perspectives: Renewable Energy and the Shifting Human Landscape," Solo Exhibition, Sydney, Australia

== Selected awards ==
- CENTER Director's Choice Award, First Place, 2010
- International Photography Awards, 1st Place, Editorial: Environmental, Pro 2013
- Photolucida Critical Mass 2013 Solo Show Award
- TIME's Best Photobooks of 2015
- International Photographer of the Year 2016, First Place, Editorial: Environmental
- International Photography Awards 2016, Professional: Book Photographer of the Year, and Monograph, First Place
- Photo Independent's 2016 Photobook Awards, Best in Show
