= Byron Wolfe =

American painter

Byron B. Wolfe
- Born: 1904; Parsons, Kansas, U.S.
- Died: 1973 (aged 68–69)
- Education: University of Kansas
- Occupations: Illustrator, painter

Byron Wolfe (1904-1973) was an American illustrator and painter of the American West. His work can be seen at the Kansas State University and the Dwight D. Eisenhower Presidential Library, Museum and Boyhood Home.

== Life ==
Wolfe was born in 1904 in Parsons, Kansas. He graduated from the University of Kansas.

Wolfe began his career as an illustrator. He later became a painter of the American West, and he joined the Cowboy Artists of America in 1966. With David Hicks Overmyer, Wolfe painted four murals in the library of Kansas State University in Manhattan, Kansas in 1934. Wolfe gave his painting called Holdin' Herd, Abilene Town, 1968 to the Dwight D. Eisenhower Presidential Library, Museum and Boyhood Home in Abilene, Kansas.

Wolfe died in 1973. His son, Wayne Wolfe, became a painter in his own right.
