= Effects of climate change on agriculture =

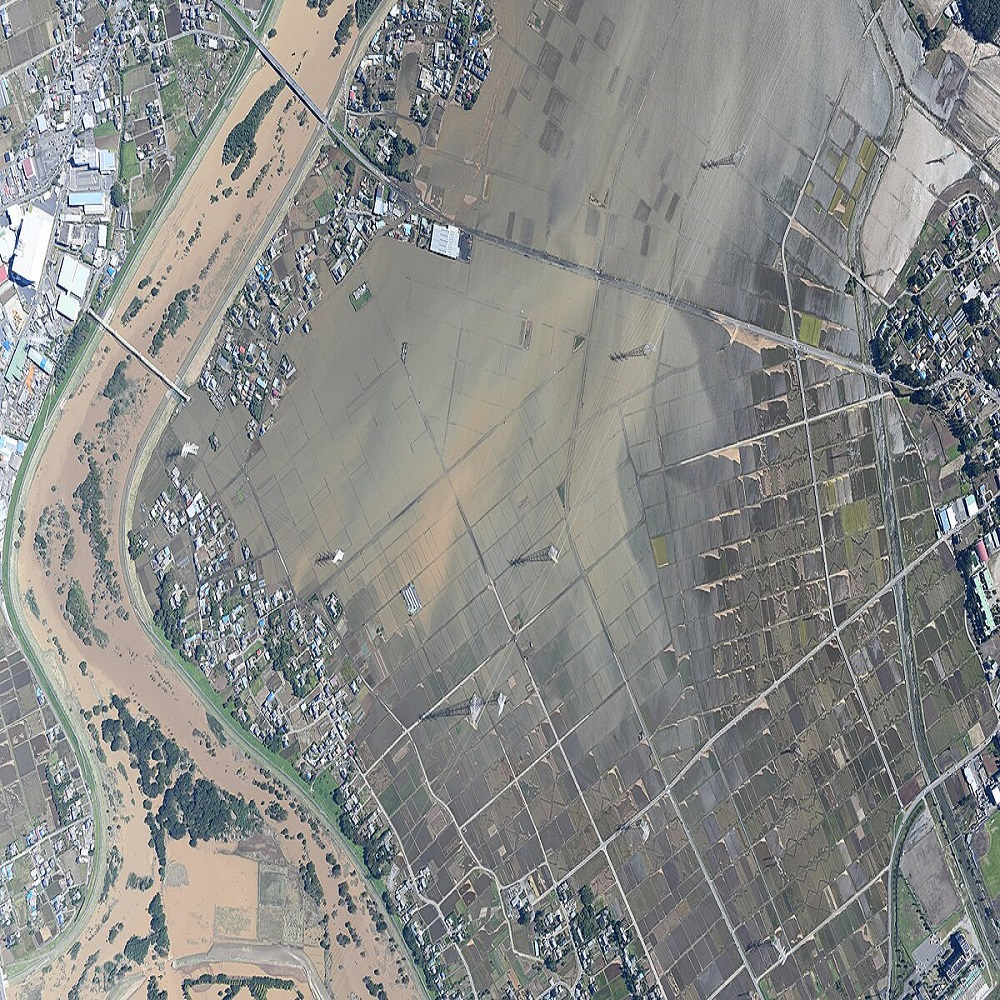
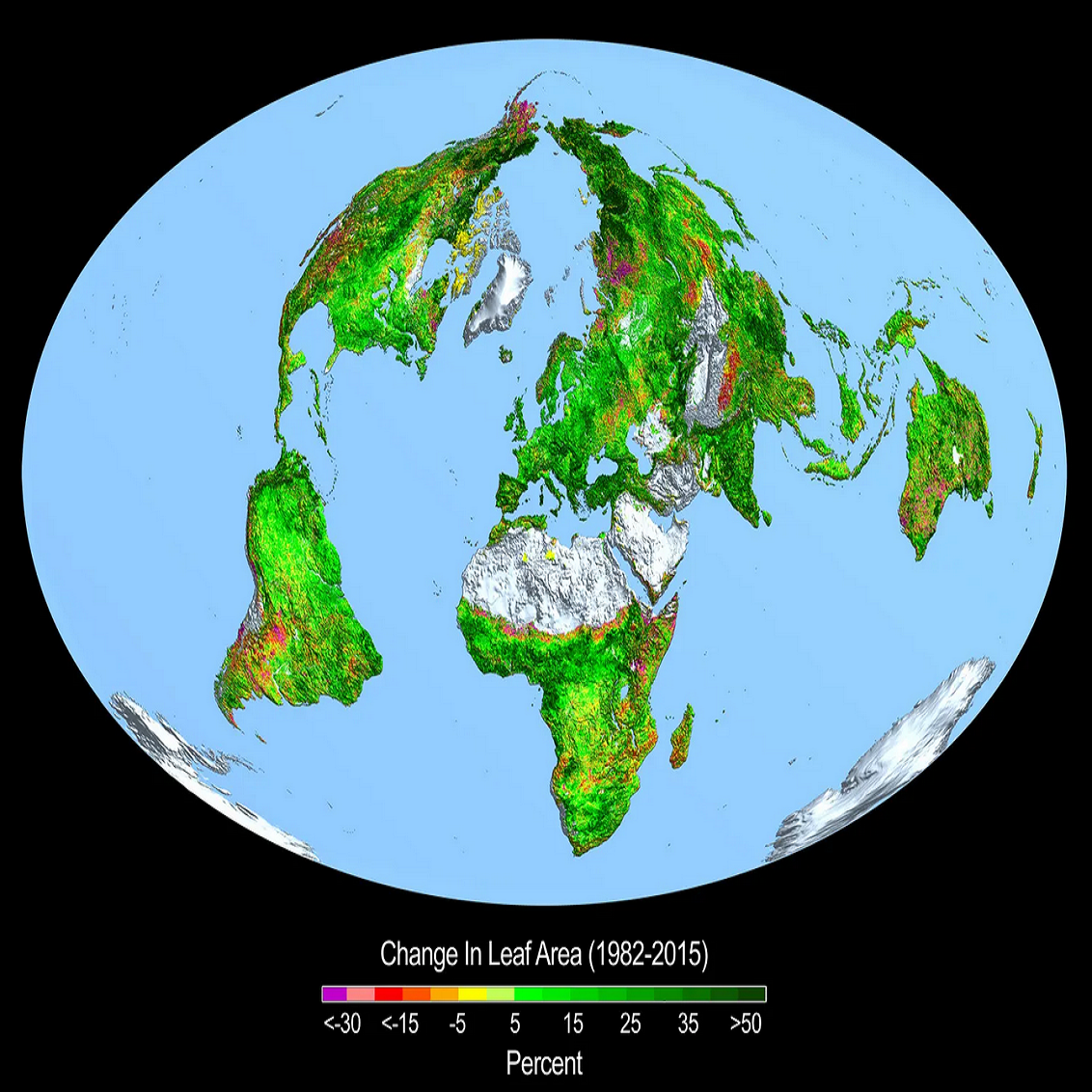
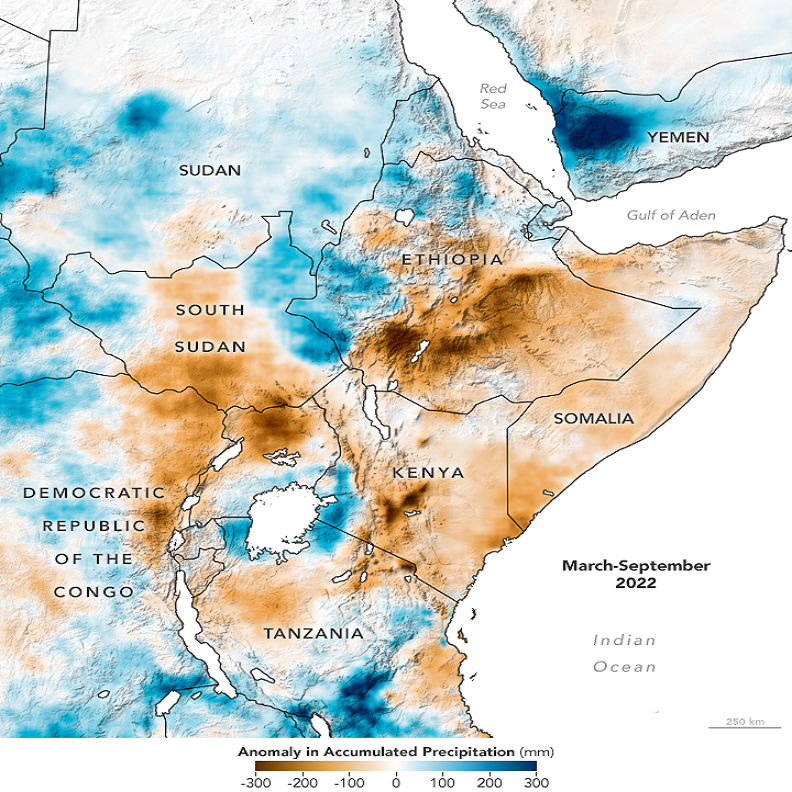
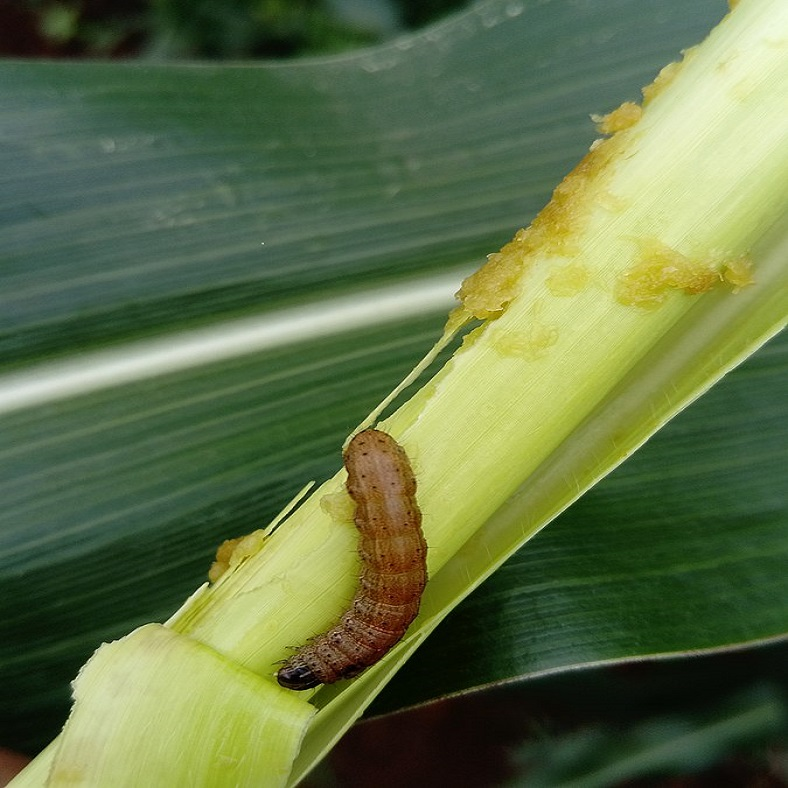
Examples of the effects of climate change on agriculture: 2019 flooding of the Toki River caused by Typhoon Hagibis, which was exacerbated by climate change; increase in global leaf area primarily caused by the CO2 fertilization effect; 2020–2023 Horn of Africa drought, the worst drought on record and made worse due to the effects of climate change on the water cycle; maize plant in Brazil attacked by fall armyworm, a pest that is expected to benefit from climate change.

There are numerous effects of climate change on agriculture, many of which are making it harder for agricultural activities to provide global food security. Recent research has found that climate change is likely to exacerbate the existing environmental impacts of agriculture by lowering crop productivity, reducing the effectiveness of agrochemicals, increasing soil erosion and pest pressures, and thereby driving greater use of land, water and inputs. Rising temperatures and changing weather patterns often result in lower crop yields due to water scarcity caused by drought, heat waves and flooding. One study found that 1°C of warming was associated with a 3 to 7% decrease in global yields of major staple crops. These effects of climate change can also increase the risk of several regions suffering simultaneous crop failures. Currently this risk is rare but if these simultaneous crop failures occur, they could have significant consequences for the global food supply. With a growing population and rapid urbanization, it is suggested that food production may increase by nearly 60% in the upcoming years. Many pests and plant diseases are expected to become more prevalent or to spread to new regions. The world's livestock are expected to be affected by many of the same issues. These issues range from greater heat stress to animal feed shortfalls and the spread of parasites and vector-borne diseases.

The increased atmospheric CO_{2} level from human activities (mainly burning of fossil fuels) causes a CO_{2} fertilization effect. This effect offsets a small portion of the detrimental effects of climate change on agriculture. However, it comes at the expense of lower levels of essential micronutrients in the crops. Furthermore, CO_{2} fertilization has little effect on C4 crops like maize. On the coasts, some agricultural land is expected to be lost to sea level rise, while melting glaciers could result in less irrigation water being available. On the other hand, more arable land may become available as frozen land thaws. Other effects include erosion and changes in soil fertility and the length of growing seasons. Bacteria like Salmonella and fungi that produce mycotoxins grow faster as the climate warms. Their growth has negative effects on food safety, food loss and prices.

Extensive research exists on the effects of climate change on individual crops, particularly on the four staple crops: corn (maize), rice, wheat and soybeans. These crops are responsible for around two-thirds of all calories consumed by humans (both directly and indirectly as animal feed). The research investigates important uncertainties, for example future population growth, which will increase global food demand for the foreseeable future. The future degree of soil erosion and groundwater depletion are further uncertainties. On the other hand, a range of improvements to agricultural yields, collectively known as the Green Revolution, has increased yields per unit of land area by between 250% and 300% since 1960. Some of that progress will likely continue.

Global food security will change relatively little in the near-term. 720 million to 811 million people were undernourished in 2021, with around 200,000 people being at a catastrophic level of food insecurity. Climate change is expected to add an additional 8 to 80 million people who are at risk of hunger by 2050. The estimated range depends on the intensity of future warming and the effectiveness of adaptation measures. Agricultural productivity growth will likely have improved food security for hundreds of millions of people by then. Predictions that reach further into the future (to 2100 and beyond) are rare. There is some concern about the effects on food security from more extreme weather events in future. Nevertheless, at this stage there is no expectation of a widespread global famine due to climate change within the 21st century.

== Direct effects from changing weather patterns ==
=== Observed changes in adverse weather conditions ===
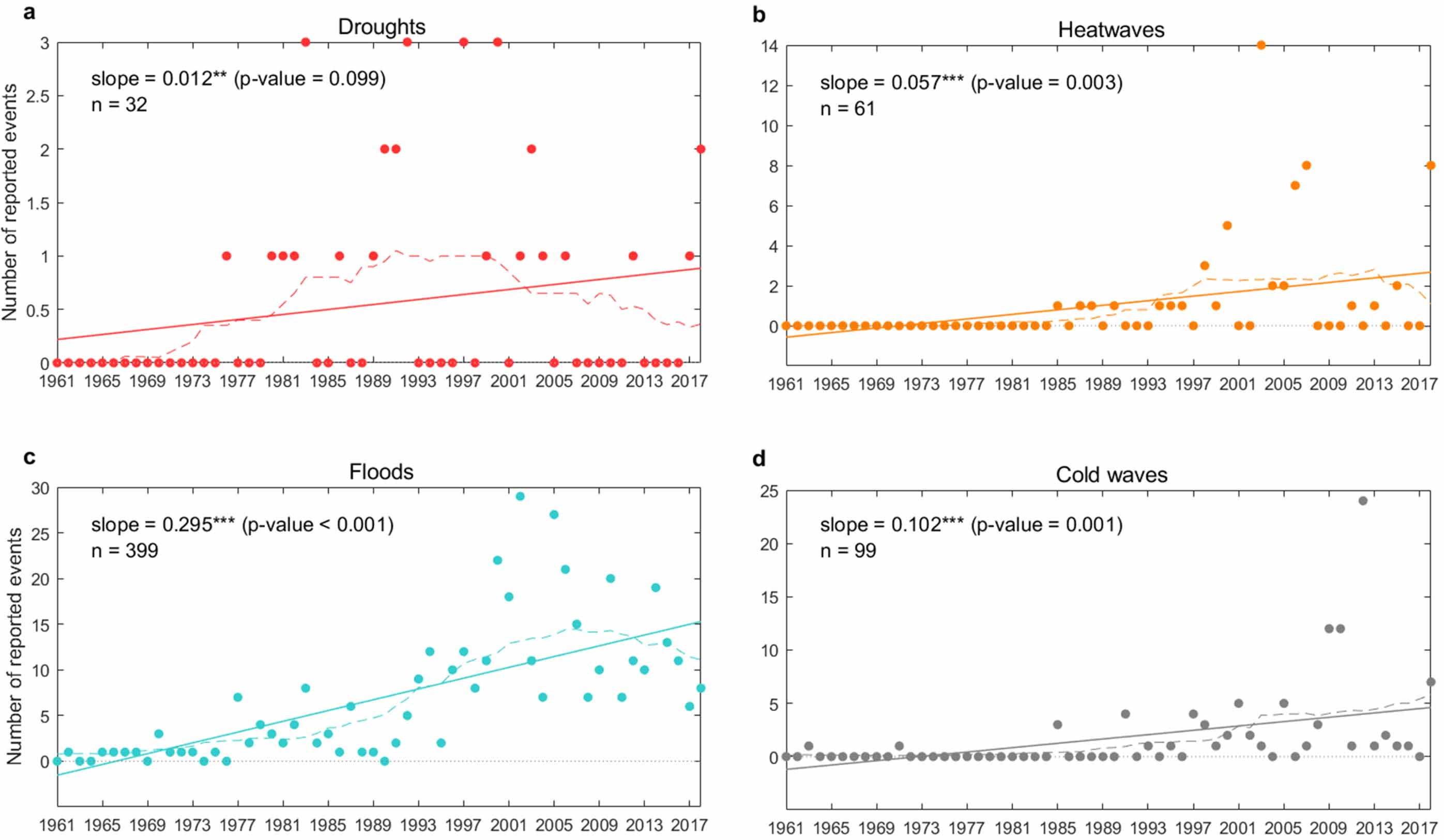
The observed increase in extreme weather events in Europe, from 1964 to 2015.

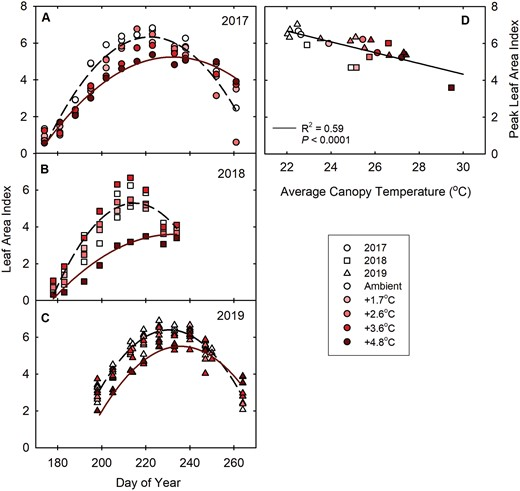
Soybean plants grow less and develop a smaller leaf area as they are exposed to temperatures beyond what they are historically used to.

Agriculture is sensitive to weather, and major events like heatwaves or droughts or heavy rains (also known as low and high precipitation extremes) can cause substantial losses. For example, Australia's farmers are very likely to suffer losses during the El Nino weather conditions, while 2003 European heat wave led to 13 billion euros in uninsured agriculture losses. Climate change is known to increase the frequency and severity of heatwaves, and to make precipitation less predictable and more prone to extremes, but since climate change attribution is still a relatively new field, connecting specific weather events and the shortfalls they cause to climate change over natural variability is often difficult. Exceptions include West Africa, where the climate-induced intensification of extreme weather was found to have already decreased millet yields by 10–20%, and sorghum yields 5–15%. Similarly, it was found that climate change had intensified drought conditions in Southern Africa in 2007, which elevated food prices and caused "acute food insecurity" in the country of Lesotho. Agriculture in Southern Africa was also adversely affected by drought after climate change intensified the effects of 2014–2016 El Niño event.

In Europe, between 1950 and 2019, heat extremes became more frequent and more likely to occur consecutively, while cold extremes have declined. At the same time, Northern Europe and much of Eastern Europe was found to experience extreme precipitation more often, while the Mediterranean became more affected by drought. Similarly, the severity of heatwave and drought effects on European crop production was found to have tripled over a 50-year period – from losses of 2.2% during 1964–1990 to losses of 7.3% in 1991–2015. In the summer of 2018, heat waves probably linked to climate change greatly reduced average yield in many parts of the world, especially Europe. During the month of August, more crop failures resulted in a rise in global food prices.

On the other hand, floods, often linked to climate change, have also had notable adverse effects on agriculture in the recent years. In May 2019, floods shortened corn planting season in the Midwestern United States, lowering the projected yield from 15 billion bushels to 14.2. During the 2021 European floods, estimates pointed to severe damage to the agricultural sector of Belgium, one of the countries hardest hit by the floods, including long-term effects like soil erosion. In China, 2023 research found that extreme rainfall had cost the country about 8% of its rice output over the two preceding decades. This was considered comparable to losses caused by extreme heat over this period.

=== Projected effects from temperature increase ===
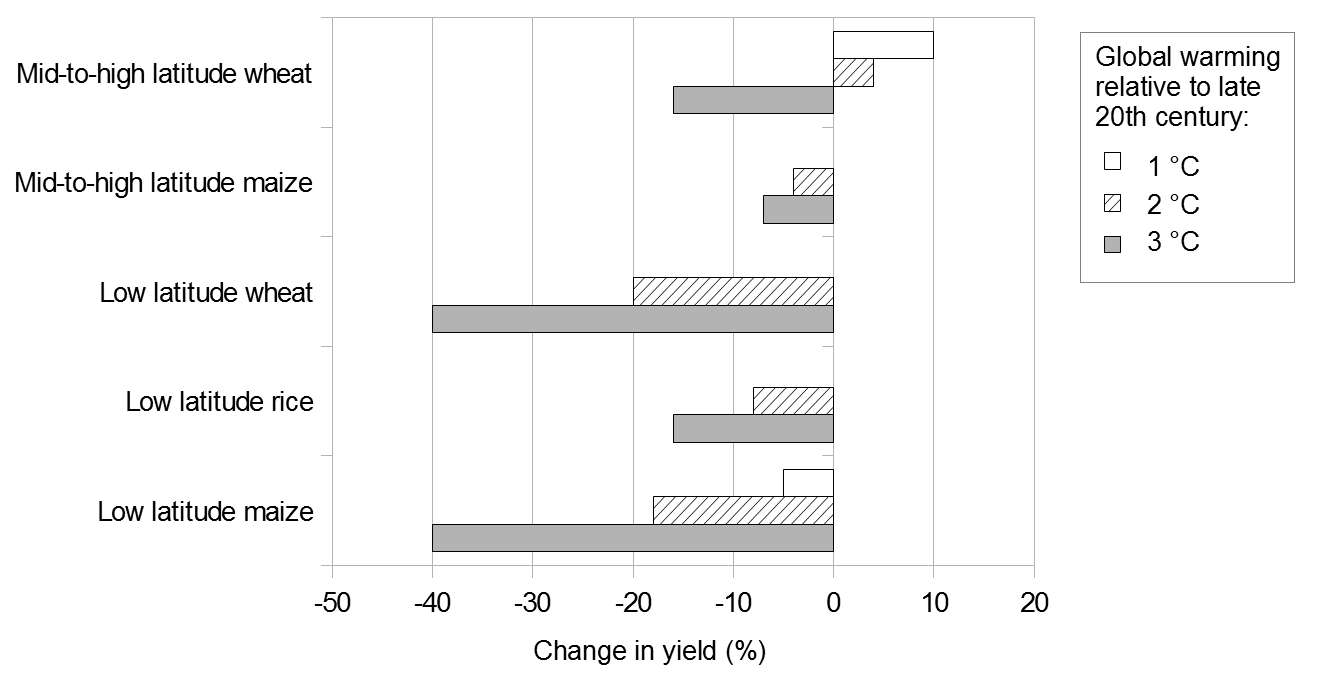
Climate-driven changes in crop yields at different latitudes, as projected by the US National Research Council in 2011.

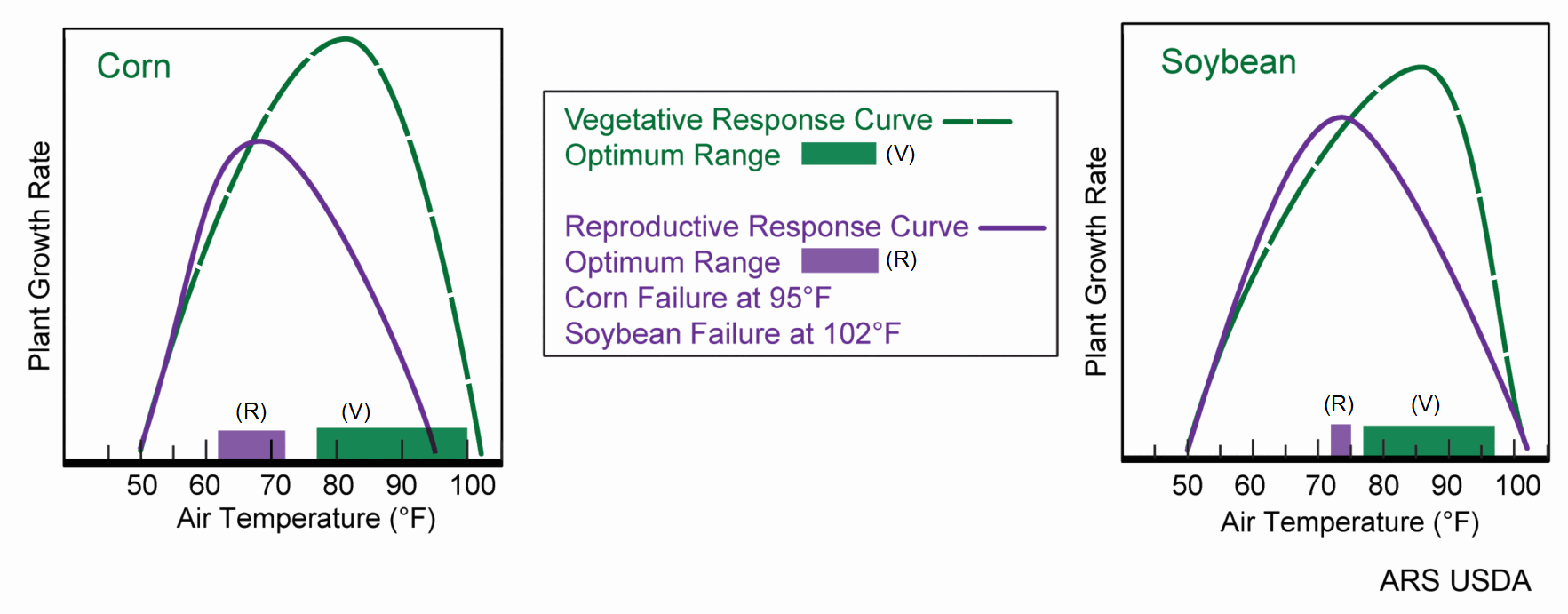
Maize will fail to reproduce at temperatures above 35 °C (95 °F) and soybean above 38.8 °C (101.8 °F).

Changes in temperature and weather patterns will alter areas suitable for farming. The current prediction is that temperatures will increase and precipitation will decrease in arid and semi-arid regions (Middle East, Africa, Australia, Southwest United States, and Southern Europe). In addition, crop yields in tropical regions will be negatively affected by the projected moderate increase in temperature (1–2 °C) expected to occur during the first half of the century. During the second half of the century, further warming is projected to decrease crop yields in all regions including Canada and the Northern United States. Many staple crops are extremely sensitive to heat and when temperatures rise over 36 °C (97 °F), soybean seedlings are killed and corn pollen loses its vitality. Warmer temperatures also contribute to the spread and growth of pests and diseases. According to some estimates, a 1 °C increase in global temperature could result in a 10–25% decline in crop yields in the future due to pest growth. According to the Intergovernmental Panel on Climate Change (IPCC) 2023 Synthesis Report, global surface temperature has increased by approximately 1.1 °C above the 1850–1900 average.

Higher winter temperatures and more frost-free days in some regions can currently be disruptive, as they can cause phenological mismatch between flowering time of plants and the activity of pollinators, threatening their reproductive success. In the longer term, however, they would result in longer growing seasons. For example, a 2014 study found that maize yields in the Heilongjiang region of China increased by between 7 and 17% per decade as a result of rising temperatures. On the other hand, a year 2017 meta-analysis comparing data from four different methods of estimating effect of warming (two types of climate model, statistical regressions and field experiments where land around certain crops was warmed by a certain amount to compare them with the controls) concluded that on a global scale, warming alone has consistently negative effects on the yields of four most important crops, suggesting that any increases would be down to precipitation changes and the CO2 fertilization effect.

A 2026 joint report by the Food and Agriculture Organization (FAO) and the World Meteorological Organization (WMO) identified 25°C as a critical temperature threshold beyond which crop yields begin to decline significantly, with effects on harvests and food prices persisting for up to a year.

==== Heat stress in livestock ====
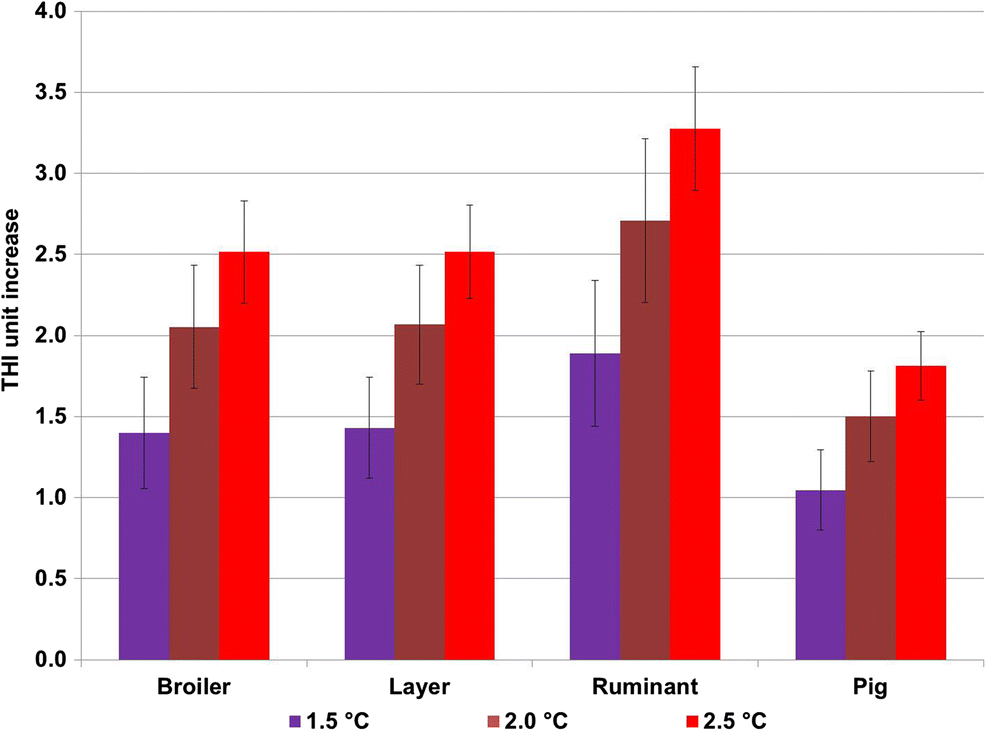
Increased intensity of global climate change causes even greater increases of thermal heat index in Jamaican farm animals. High thermal heat index is one of the more widely used indicators of heat stress.

In general, the preferred ambient temperature range for domestic animals is between 10 and 30 °C (50 and 86 °F). Much like how climate change is expected to increase overall thermal comfort for humans living in the colder regions of the world, livestock in those places would also benefit from warmer winters. Across the entire world, however, increasing summertime temperatures as well as more frequent and intense heatwaves will have clearly negative effects, substantially elevating the risk of livestock suffering from heat stress. Under the climate change scenario of highest emissions and greatest warming, SSP5-8.5, "cattle, sheep, goats, pigs and poultry in the low latitudes will face 72–136 additional days per year of extreme stress from high heat and humidity".

In Jamaica, considered representative of the Caribbean region, all livestock animals besides layer hens are already exposed to "very severe" heat stress in the present climate, with pigs being exposed to it at least once per day during the 5 summer and early autumn months, while ruminants and broilers only avoid daily exposure to very severe heat stress during the winter. it has been projected that even at 1.5 °C (2.7 °F) of global warming, "very severe" heat stress would become a daily event for ruminants and broilers. By 2 °C (3.6 °F), it would be felt for a longer duration, and extensive cooling systems would likely become a necessity for livestock production in the Caribbean. At 2.5 °C (4.5 °F), only layer hens would avoid daily exposure to "very severe" heat stress during the winter months.

Studies of heat stress and livestock had historically focused on cattle, as they are often kept outdoors and so are immediately exposed to changes in climate. On the other hand, a little over 50% of all pork production and 70% of all poultry production worldwide originated from animals kept entirely in confined buildings even around 2006, and the raw numbers were expected to increase by 3–3.5 times for pigs, by 2–2.4 times for layer hens and 4.4–5 times for broilers. Historically, livestock in these conditions were considered less vulnerable to warming than the animals in outdoor areas due to inhabiting insulated buildings, where ventilation systems are used to control the climate and relieve the excess heat. However, in the historically cooler midlatitude regions, indoor temperatures were already higher than the outdoor temperatures even in summer, and as the increased heating exceeds these systems' specifications, confined animals are left more vulnerable to the heat than those kept outdoors.

=== Changes in agricultural water availability and reliability ===
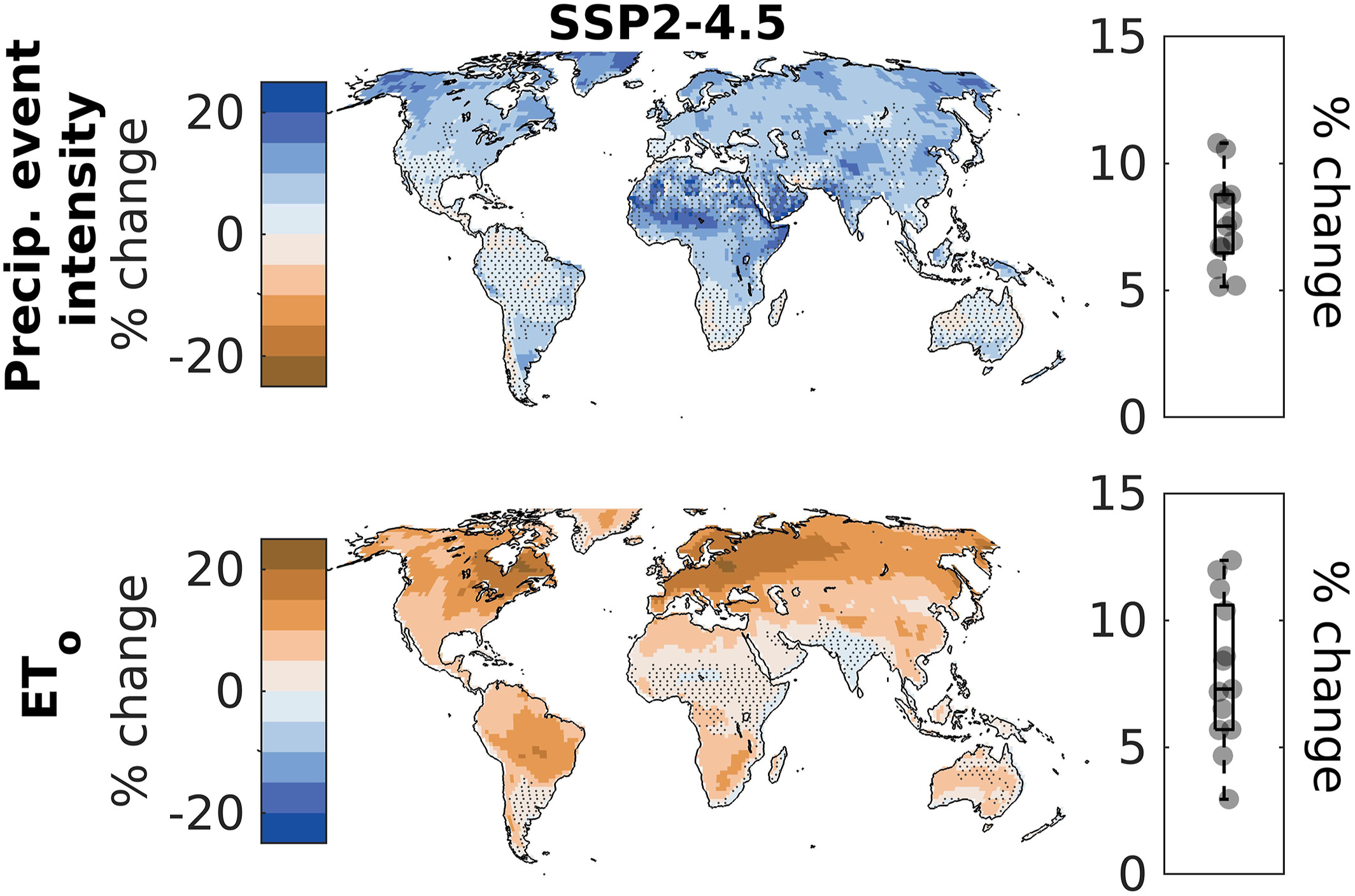
Future warming is expected to consistently increase the strength of heavy rainfall, yet it also consistently increases the amount of water plants lose through evapotranspiration. This effect is counteracted by the CO_{2} fertilization effect, but at times not enough to avoid events like the 2020–2023 Horn of Africa drought.

Historical drought frequency on rainfed cropland, 1984–2023.

Both droughts and floods contribute to decreases in crop yields. On average, climate change increases the overall amount of water contained in the atmosphere by 7% per every 1 °C (1.8 °F), thus increasing precipitation. However, this increase in precipitation is not distributed evenly in space (atmospheric circulation patterns already cause different areas to receive different amounts of rainfall) or time: heavy rainfall, with the potential to cause floods, becomes more frequent. This means that under the probable mid-range climate change scenario, SSP2-4.5, precipitation events globally will become larger by 11.5%, yet the time between them will increase by an average of 5.1%. Under the highest-emission scenario SSP5-8.5, there will be an 18.5% increase in size of events and 9.6% increase in the duration between them. At the same time, water losses by plants through evapotranspiration will increase almost everywhere due to higher temperatures. While the CO_{2} fertilization effect also reduces such losses by plants, it depends on the area's climate which effect will dominate. As such, the 2020–2023 Horn of Africa drought has been primarily attributed to the great increase in evapotranspiration exacerbating the effect of persistent low rainfall, which would have been more manageable in the cooler preindustrial climate.

In total, this means that droughts have been occurring more frequently on average because of climate change. Africa, southern Europe, the Middle East, most of the Americas, Australia, South and Southeast Asia are the parts of the globe where droughts are expected to become more frequent and intense in spite of the global increase in precipitation. Droughts disturb terrestrial precipitation, evaporation and soil moisture, and these effects can be aggravated by population growth and urban expansion spurring on increased demand for water. The ultimate outcome is water scarcity, which results in crop failures and the loss of pasture grazing land for livestock, exacerbating pre-existing poverty in developing countries and leading to malnutrition and potentially famine.

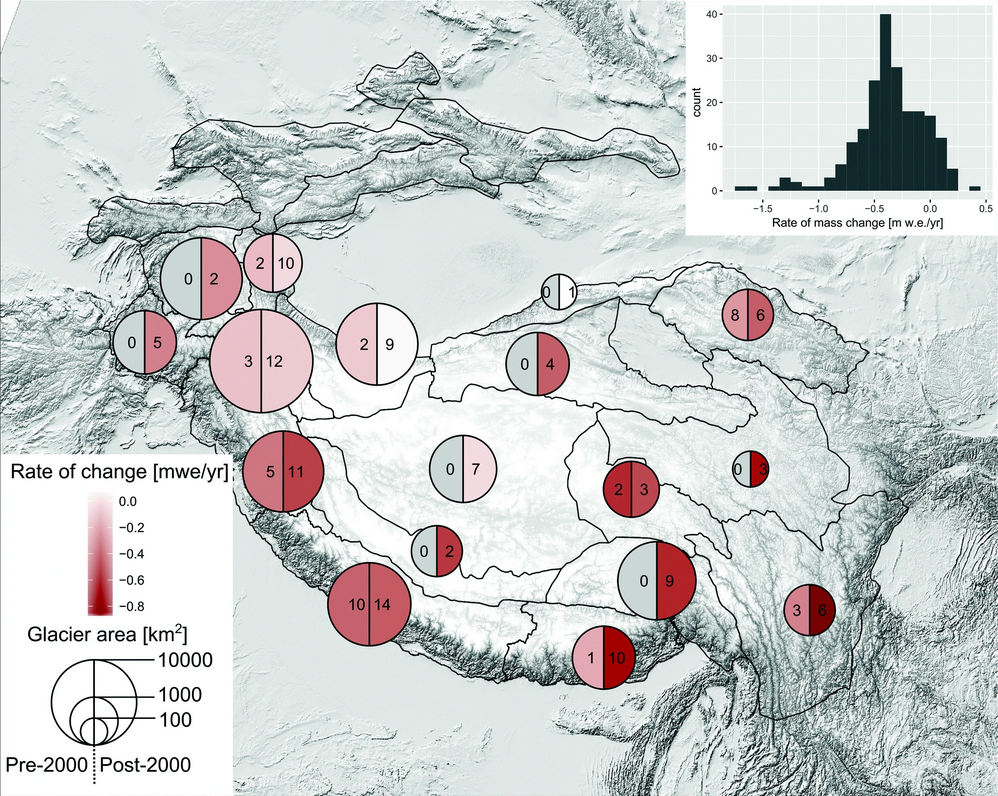
Observed glacier mass loss in the Hindu Kush Himalayas region since the 20th century.

Irrigation of crops is able to reduce or even remove the effects on yields of lower rainfall and higher temperatures – through localized cooling. However, using water resources for irrigation has downsides and is expensive. Further, some sources of irrigation water may become less reliable. This includes irrigation driven by water runoff from glaciers during the summer, as there has already been an observed retreat of glaciers since 1850, and it is expected to continue, depleting the glacial ice and reducing or outright eliminating runoff. In Asia, global warming of 1.5 °C (2.7 °F) will reduce the ice mass of Asia's high mountains by about 29–43%,: Approximately 2.4 billion people live in the drainage basin of the Himalayan rivers: In India alone, the river Ganges provides water for drinking and farming for more than 500 million people. In the Indus River watershed, these mountain water resources contribute to up to 60% of irrigation outside of the monsoon season, and an additional 11% of total crop production. Since Effects of climate change on the water cycle are projected to substantially increase precipitation in all but the westernmost parts of the watershed, the loss of the glaciers is expected to be offset: however, agriculture in the region will become more reliable on monsoon than ever, and hydropower generation would become less predictable and reliable.

== Effects on plants caused by increasing atmospheric CO_{2} and methane ==
Plants respond to increased atmospheric carbon dioxide concentrations through multiple physiological changes. Atmospheric carbon dioxide (CO_{2}) increases affect plant growth patterns and physiological functions in multiple ways. Higher levels of carbon dioxide amplify both crop yields and biomass production through enhanced photosynthetic processes. The partial closure of stomata under elevated CO_{2} levels leads to reduced plant water loss and enhances water-use efficiency. Elevated atmospheric CO_{2} and CH_{4} concentrations can have a range of effects on plant growth, physiology and ecosystem process via multiple pathways. In the case of C_{3} plants, CO_{2} fertilization usually more than doubles the initial stimulation of photosynthesis by increased CO_{2}, resulting in increased rates of carbon assimilation, vegetative growth, and, under some circumstances, crop yield. This so-called CO_{2} fertilization effect has been demonstrated in controlled systems, such as Free-Air CO_{2} Enrichment (FACE) trials that are designed to mimic predicted future atmospheric conditions and monitor plant responses under open-air conditions. Moreover, increased CO_{2} can cause partial stomatal closing to reduce transpiration, and enhance water use-efficiency in plant, especially under drought stress.

However, the benefits of CO_{2} enrichment may be moderated by nutrient limitations, particularly nitrogen and phosphorus, which constrain biomass accumulation in natural ecosystems. Methane, while less directly involved in photosynthesis, contributes to climate warming and alters plant communities indirectly through changes in temperature, precipitation patterns, and soil conditions. In wetland environments, increased atmospheric methane can enhance methanotrophic activity in the rhizosphere, influencing nutrient cycling and root-microbe interactions. Furthermore, elevated greenhouse gas levels may affect plant-insect interactions, pathogen dynamics, and secondary metabolite production, complicating predictions about future ecosystem health and productivity.

=== Higher yields due to CO_{2} fertilization ===
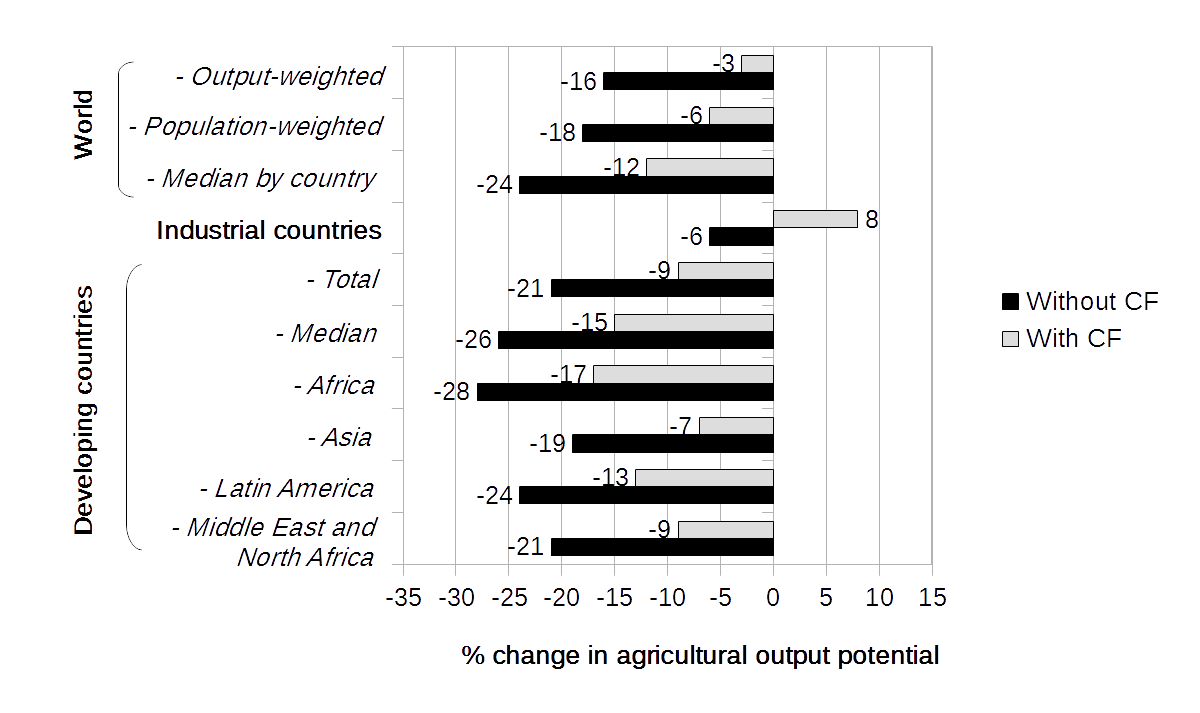
CO_{2} fertilization (grey) results in substantially less severe cumulative effects on agricultural productivity compared to its absence (black), as estimated by the IPCC in 2007.

A 1993 review of scientific greenhouse studies found that a doubling of CO_{2} concentration would stimulate the growth of 156 different plant species by an average of 37%. Response varied significantly by species, with some showing much greater gains and a few showing a loss. For example, a 1979 greenhouse study found that with doubled CO_{2} concentration the dry weight of 40-day-old cotton plants doubled, but the dry weight of 30-day-old maize plants increased by only 20%.

In addition to greenhouse studies, field and satellite measurements attempt to understand the effect of increased CO_{2} in more natural environments. In free-air carbon dioxide enrichment (FACE) experiments plants are grown in field plots and the CO_{2} concentration of the surrounding air is artificially elevated. These experiments generally use lower CO_{2} levels than the greenhouse studies. They show lower gains in growth than greenhouse studies, with the gains depending heavily on the species under study. A 2005 review of 12 experiments at 475–600 ppm showed an average gain of 17% in crop yield, with legumes typically showing a greater response than other species and C4 plants generally showing less. The review also stated that the experiments have their own limitations. The studied CO_{2} levels were lower, and most of the experiments were carried out in temperate regions. Satellite measurements found increasing leaf area index for 25% to 50% of Earth's vegetated area over the past 35 years (i.e., a greening of the planet), providing evidence for a positive CO_{2} fertilization effect.

Although the greening of vegetated parts of Earth has been noted, the continuing positive effect of CO_{2} fertilization will remain uncertain over the long-term. Historically, agriculture has relied on the use of synthetic fertilizers, herbicides, and insecticides, combined with advancements in irrigation and biotechnological approaches to boost productivity.. It has been reported that the positive effects of elevated CO_{2} on plant growth may be attenuated by nutrient limitations, particularly N and P, which are crucial for biomass production and long-term productivity. Moreover, although satellite data indicate a widespread increase in LAI, the greening trend does not necessarily translate into a proportionate increase in carbon sequestration, because of reduced carbon residence times and enhanced ecosystem respiration with warming, as well as unaccounted carbon losses. Thus, despite enhancing global greening through CO_{2} fertilization, the potential for it to compensate for anthropogenic emissions appears to be restricted without corresponding adjustments to nutrient supply and land management.

=== Reduced nutritional value of crops ===
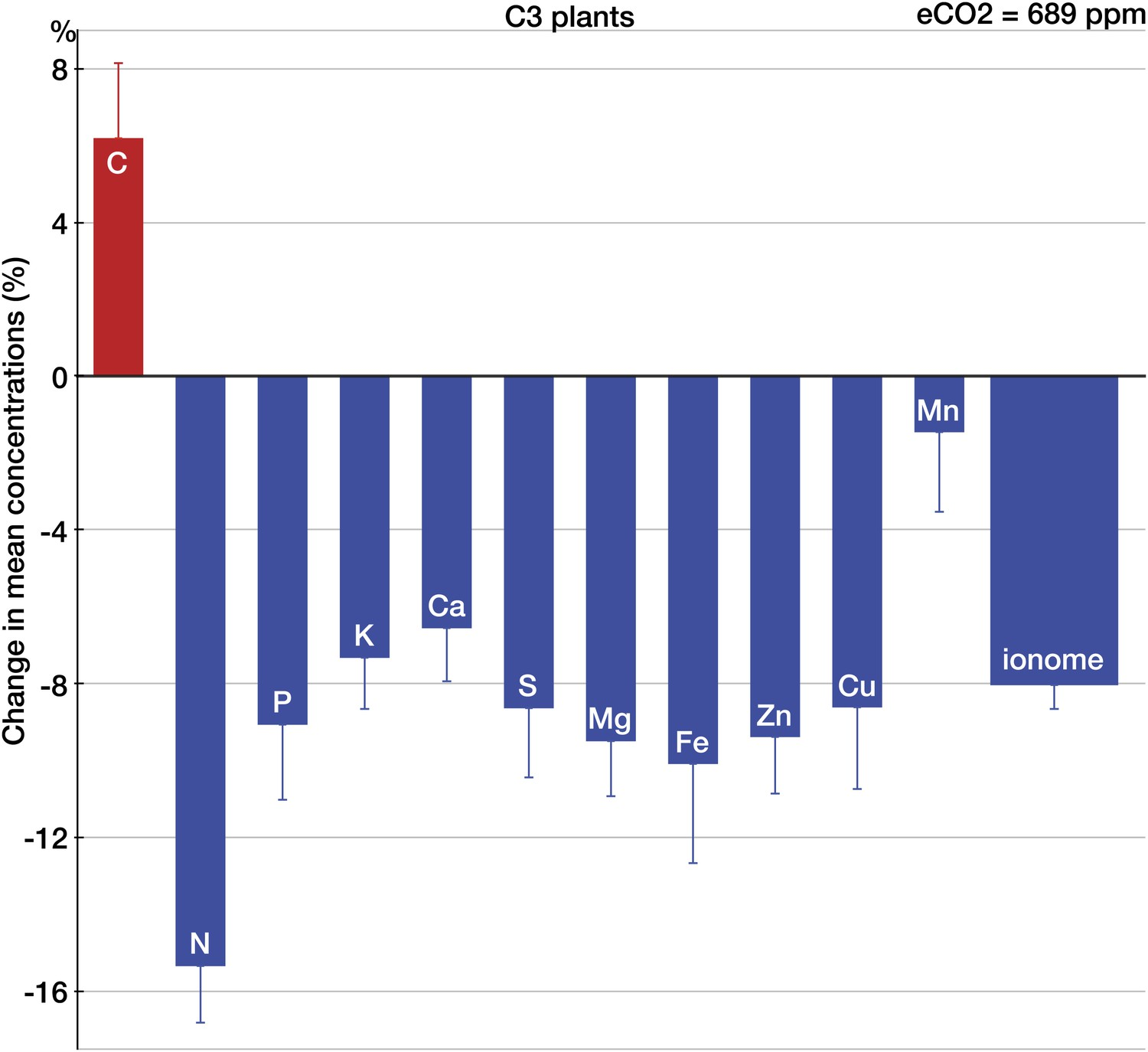
Average decrease of micronutrient density across a range of crops at elevated CO_{2} concentrations, reconstructed from multiple studies through a meta-analysis. The elevated concentration in this figure, 689 ppm, is over 50% greater than the current levels, yet it is expected to be approached under the "mid-range" climate change scenarios, and will be surpassed in the high-emission one.

Changes in atmospheric carbon dioxide may reduce the nutritional quality of some crops, with for instance wheat having less protein and less of some minerals. The nutritional quality of C3 plants (e.g. wheat, oats, rice) is especially at risk: lower levels of protein as well as minerals (for example zinc and iron) are expected. Food crops could see a reduction of protein, iron and zinc content in common food crops of 3 to 17%. This is the projected result of food grown under the expected atmospheric carbon-dioxide levels of 2050. Using data from the UN Food and Agriculture Organization as well as other public sources, the authors analysed 225 different staple foods, such as wheat, rice, maize, vegetables, roots and fruits.

The effect of increased levels of atmospheric carbon dioxide on the nutritional quality of plants is not limited only to the above-mentioned crop categories and nutrients. A 2014 meta-analysis has shown that crops and wild plants exposed to elevated carbon dioxide levels at various latitudes have lower density of several minerals such as magnesium, iron, zinc, and potassium.

Studies using Free-Air Concentration Enrichment have also shown that increases in CO_{2} lead to decreased concentrations of micronutrients in crop and non-crop plants with negative consequences for human nutrition, including decreased B vitamins in rice. This may have knock-on effects on other parts of ecosystems as herbivores will need to eat more food to gain the same amount of protein.

Empirical evidence shows that increasing levels of CO_{2} result in lower concentrations of many minerals in plant tissues. Doubling CO_{2} levels results in an 8% decline, on average, in the concentration of minerals. Declines in magnesium, calcium, potassium, iron, zinc and other minerals in crops can worsen the quality of human nutrition. Researchers report that the CO_{2} levels expected in the second half of the 21st century will likely reduce the levels of zinc, iron, and protein in wheat, rice, peas, and soybeans. Some two billion people live in countries where citizens receive more than 60 per cent of their zinc or iron from these types of crops. Deficiencies of these nutrients already cause an estimated loss of 63 million life-years annually.

Alongside a decrease in minerals, evidence shows that plants contain 6% more carbon, 15% less nitrogen, 9% less phosphorus, and 9% less sulfur at double CO_{2} conditions. The increase in carbon is mostly attributed to carbohydrates without a structural role in plants – the human-digestable, calorie-providing starch and simple sugars. The decrease in nitrogen translates directly into a decrease in the protein content. As a result, higher CO_{2} not only reduce a plant's micronutrients, but also the quality of its macronutrient combination.

These nutritional declines have severe consequences for public health worldwide, and especially in areas where they have traditionally consumed plant-based diets. Populations in low- and middle-income countries are particularly at risk, having staple crops like rice and wheat as the primary sources of their daily protein, iron and zinc. Potential nutrient losses as a result of changes in crop composition due to CO_{2} could make any deficiencies that already exist worse and increase the incidence of anemia, stunting, and the development of cognitive skills. Apart from the effect on humans, such changes in nutrient content can cascade through food webs, with herbivores needing to ingest more biomass to meet their dietary needs, which could have implications for ecosystem dynamics. These results highlight the importance of not just looking at crop yields in future climate scenarios, but also at the nutritional merits of yields in terms of their potential to support human and ecological health.

=== Increasing damages from surface-level ozone ===
Anthropogenic methane emissions have a significant contribution to warming due to the high global warming potential of methane. At the same time, methane also acts as a precursor to surface ozone, which is a significant air pollutant. Its effects include lowering physiological functions and therefore the yield and quality of crops. Following methane levels, tropospheric ozone levels "increased substantially since the late 19th century", and according to a 2016 estimate, the four major crops (see later section) experienced yield losses of 5±1.5% relative to a no-climate change scenario due to ozone increases alone, which is nearly half of the negative effects caused by the other effects of climate change (10.9±3.2%), and cancels out most of the CO_{2} fertilization effect (6.5±1.0%).

== Changes in the extent and quality of agricultural land ==
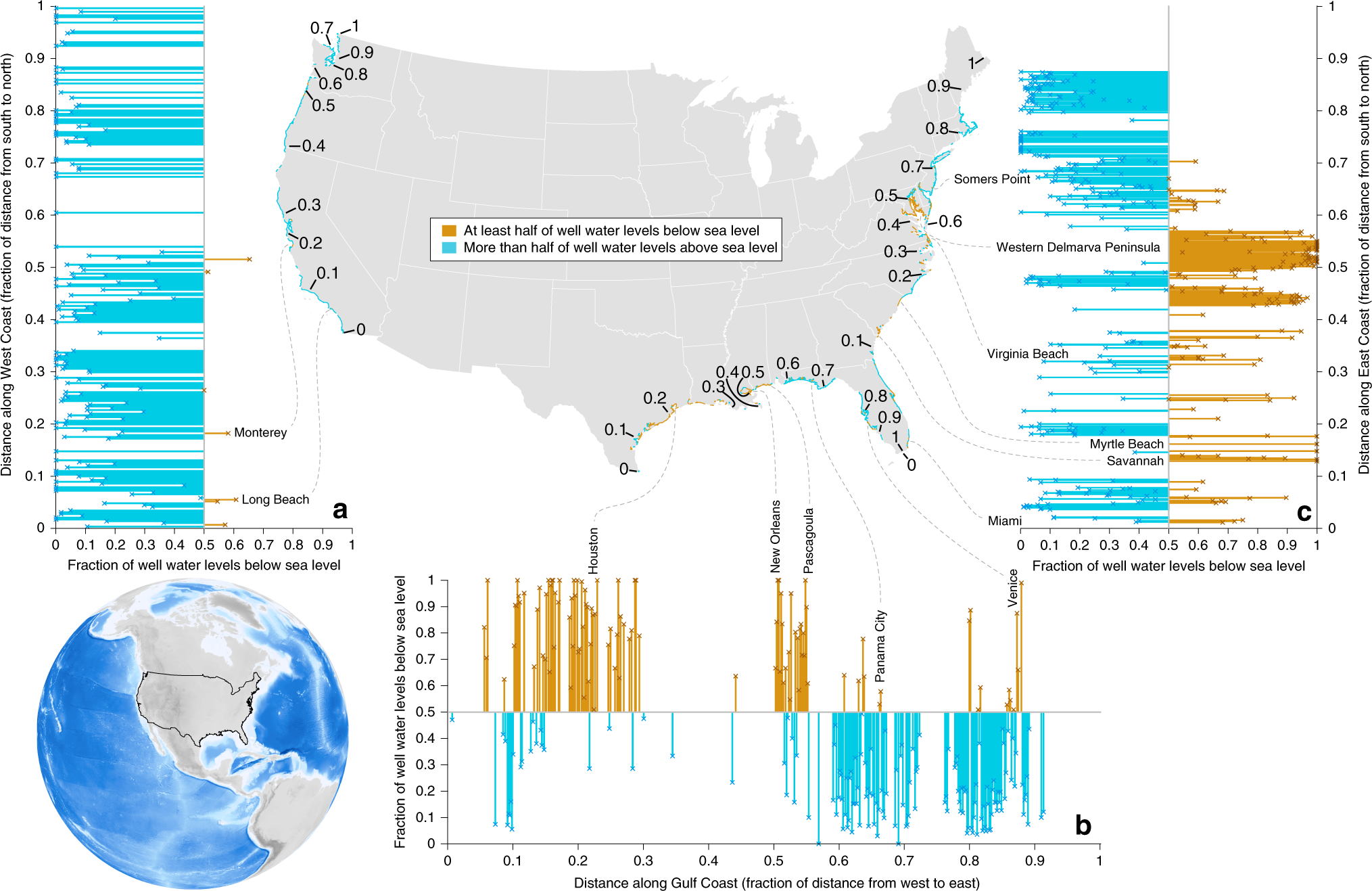
Some locations alongside the United States' coast have over half of their freshwater wells below sea level, leaving them vulnerable to saltwater infiltration.

=== Erosion and soil fertility ===
The warmer atmospheric temperatures observed over the past decades are expected to lead to a more vigorous hydrological cycle, including more extreme rainfall events. Erosion, soil degradation, and soil compaction are more likely to occur as a result of heavy rainfall and extreme weather events. Soil fertility would also be affected by global warming. These restrict crop development. Increased erosion in agricultural landscapes from anthropogenic factors can occur with losses of up to 22% of soil carbon in 50 years.

Climate change will also cause soils to warm. Elevated temperatures can accelerate the decomposition of soil organic matter, reducing soil organic carbon and decreasing the soil's ability to retain nutrients and hold water. These factors collectively contribute to reduced soil quality, thus affecting crop growth. In turn, this could cause the soil microbe population size to dramatically increase 40–150%. Warmer conditions would favour growth of certain bacteria species, shifting the bacterial community composition. Elevated carbon dioxide would increase the growth rates of plants and soil microbes, slowing the soil carbon cycle and favouring oligotrophs, which are slower-growing and more resource efficient than copiotrophs.

=== Agricultural land loss from sea level rise ===
A rise in the sea level would result in an agricultural land loss, in particular in areas such as South East Asia. Erosion, submergence of shorelines, salinity of the water table due to the increased sea levels, could mainly affect agriculture through inundation of low-lying lands. Low-lying areas such as Bangladesh, India and Vietnam will experience major loss of rice crop if sea levels rise as expected by the end of the century. Vietnam for example relies heavily on its southern tip, where the Mekong Delta lies, for rice planting. A one-metre rise in sea level will cover several square kilometres of rice paddies in Vietnam.

Besides simply flooding agricultural land, sea level rise can also cause saltwater intrusion into freshwater wells, particularly if they are already below sea level. Once the concentration of saltwater exceeds 2–3%, the well becomes unusable. Notably, areas along an estimated 15% of the US coastline already have the majority of local groundwater below the sea level.

=== Thawing of potentially arable land ===
Climate change may increase the amount of arable land by reducing the amount of frozen land. A 2005 study reports that temperature in Siberia has increased three-degree Celsius in average since 1960 (much more than the rest of the world). A 2025 study of the Arctic part of Western Siberia estimated that by 2100, the permafrost would increasingly thaw and the southern boundary of the permafrost zone would shift northward. However, reports about the effect of global warming on Russian agriculture indicate conflicting probable effects: while they expect a northward extension of farmable lands, they also warn of possible productivity losses and increased risk of drought.

The Arctic region is expected to benefit from increased opportunities for agriculture and forestry.

== Response of insects, plant diseases and weeds ==
Climate change will alter pest, plant disease and weed distributions, with potential to reduce crop yields, including of staple crops like wheat, soybeans, and corn (maize). Warmer temperatures can increase the metabolic rate and number of breeding cycles of insect populations. Historically, cold temperatures at night and in the winter months would kill off insects, bacteria and fungi. The warmer, wetter winters are promoting fungal plant diseases like wheat rusts (stripe and brown/leaf) and soybean rust to travel northward. The increasing incidence of flooding and heavy rains also promotes the growth of various other plant pests and diseases.

=== Insect pollinators and pests ===
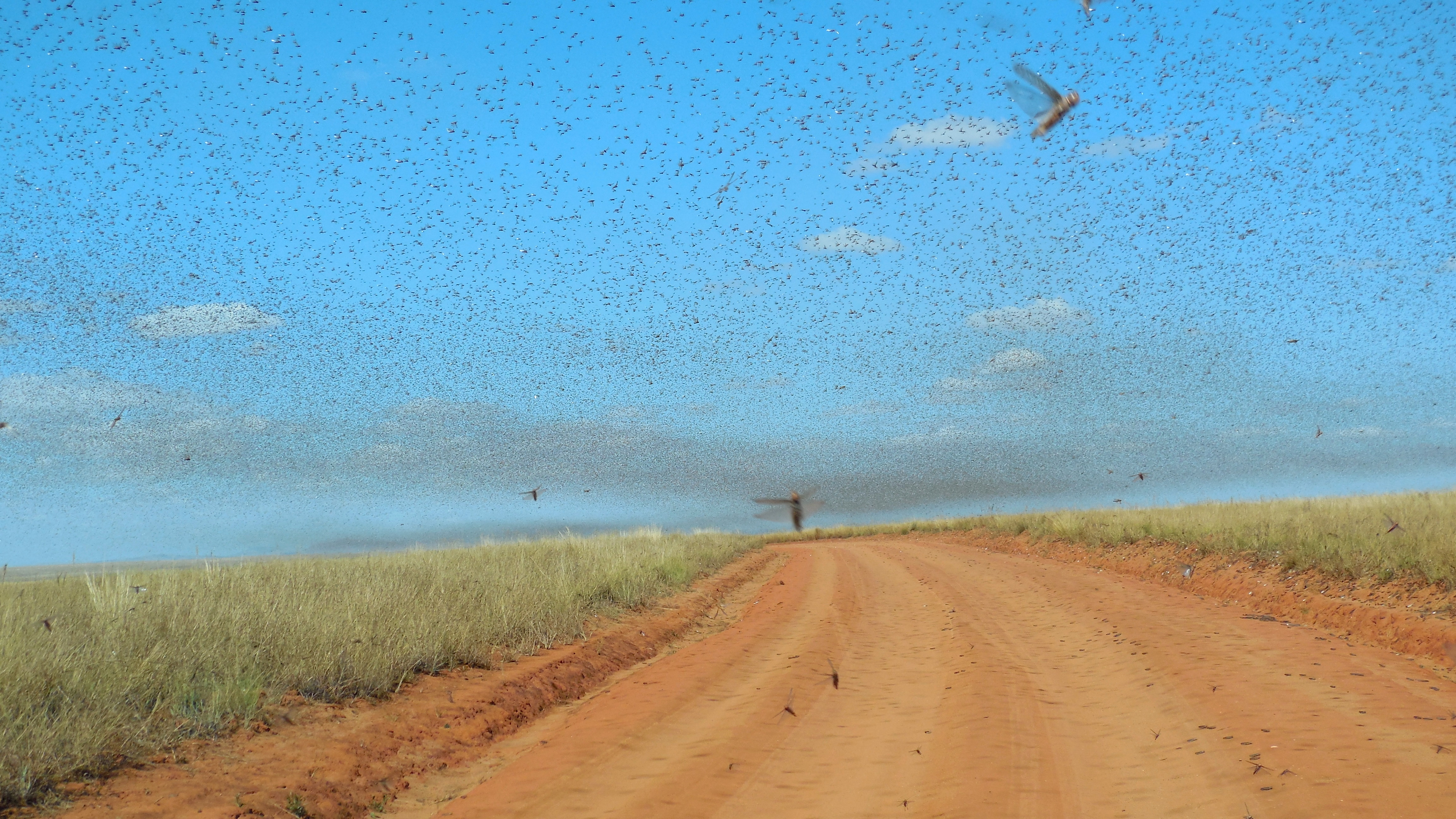
Locust swarm near Satrokala, Madagascar in 2014.

Climate change is expected to have a negative effect on many insects, greatly reducing their species distribution and thus increasing their risk of going extinct. Around 9% of agricultural production is dependent in some way on insect pollination, and some pollinator species are also adversely affected, with wild bumblebees known to be particularly vulnerable to recent warming.

At the same time, insects are the most diverse animal taxa, and some species will benefit from the changes, including notable agricultural pests and disease vectors. Insects that previously had only two breeding cycles per year could gain an additional cycle if warm growing seasons extend, causing a population boom. Temperate places and higher latitudes are more likely to experience a dramatic change in insect populations: for instance, the Mountain Pine Beetle epidemic in British Columbia, Canada had killed millions of pine trees, partially because the winters were not cold enough to slow or kill the growing beetle larvae. Likewise, potato tuber moth and Colorado potato beetle are predicted to spread into areas currently too cold for them.

Further, effects of climate change on the water cycle often mean that both wet seasons and drought seasons will become more intense. Some insect species will breed more rapidly because they are better able to take advantage of such changes in conditions. This includes certain insect pests, such as aphids and whiteflies: similarly, locust swarms could also cause more damage as the result. A notable example was the 2019–2022 locust infestation focused on East Africa, considered the worst of its kind in many decades.

The fall armyworm, Spodoptera frugiperda, is a highly invasive plant pest, which can cause have massive damage to crops, especially maize. In the recent years, it has spread to countries in sub-Saharan Africa, and this spread is linked to climate change. It is expected that these highly invasive crop pests will spread to other parts of the planet since they have a high capacity to adapt to different environments.

=== Weeds ===
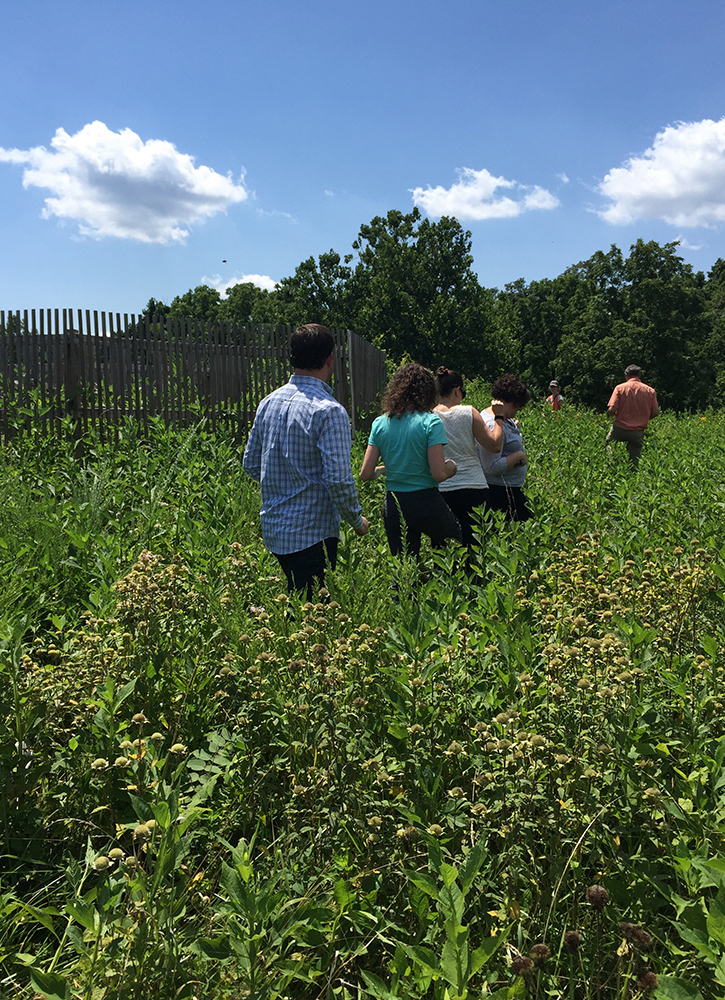
A continental-scale research platform for long-term study of the effects of climate change, land-use change and invasive species on ecological systems (research site in Front Royal, Virginia, U.S.)

A changing climate may favour the more biologically diverse weeds over the monocrops on many farms. Characteristics of weeds such as their genetic diversity, cross-breeding ability, and fast-growth rates put them at an advantage in changing climates as these characteristics allow them to adapt readily in comparison to most farm's uniform crops, and give them a biological advantage.

Weeds also undergo the same acceleration of cycles as cultivated crops, and would also benefit from CO_{2} fertilization. Since most weeds are C3 plants, they are likely to compete even more than now against C4 crops such as corn. The increased CO_{2} levels are also expected to increase the tolerance of weeds to herbicides, reducing their efficiency. However, this may be counteracted by increased temperatures elevating their effectiveness.

=== Plant pathogens ===
Currently, pathogens result in losses of 10–16% of the global harvest and this level is likely to rise as plants are at an ever-increasing risk of exposure to pests and pathogens. Research has shown that climate change may alter the developmental stages of plant pathogens that can affect crops. This includes several pathogens associated with potato blackleg disease (e.g. Dickeya), as they grow and reproduce faster at higher temperatures. The warming is also expected to elevate food safety issues and food spoilage caused by mycotoxin-producing fungi, and bacteria such as Salmonella.

Climate change would cause an increase in rainfall in some areas, which would lead to an increase of atmospheric humidity and the duration of the wet seasons. Combined with higher temperatures, these conditions could favour the development of fungal diseases, such as late blight, or bacterial infections such as Ralstonia solanacearum, which may also be able to spread more easily through flash flooding.

Climate change has the capability of altering pathogen and host interactions, specifically the rates of pathogen infection and the resistance of the host plant. Also affected by plant disease are the economic costs associated with growing different plants that might yield less profit as well as treating and managing already diseased crops. For instance, soybean rust is a vicious plant pathogen that can kill off entire fields in a matter of days, devastating farmers and costing billions in agricultural losses. Change in weather patterns and temperature due to climate change leads to dispersal of plant pathogens as hosts migrate to areas with more favourable conditions. This increases crop losses due to diseases. For instance, aphids act as vectors for many potato viruses and will be able to spread further due to increased temperatures.

== Effects on crop yields ==
=== Observed effects ===
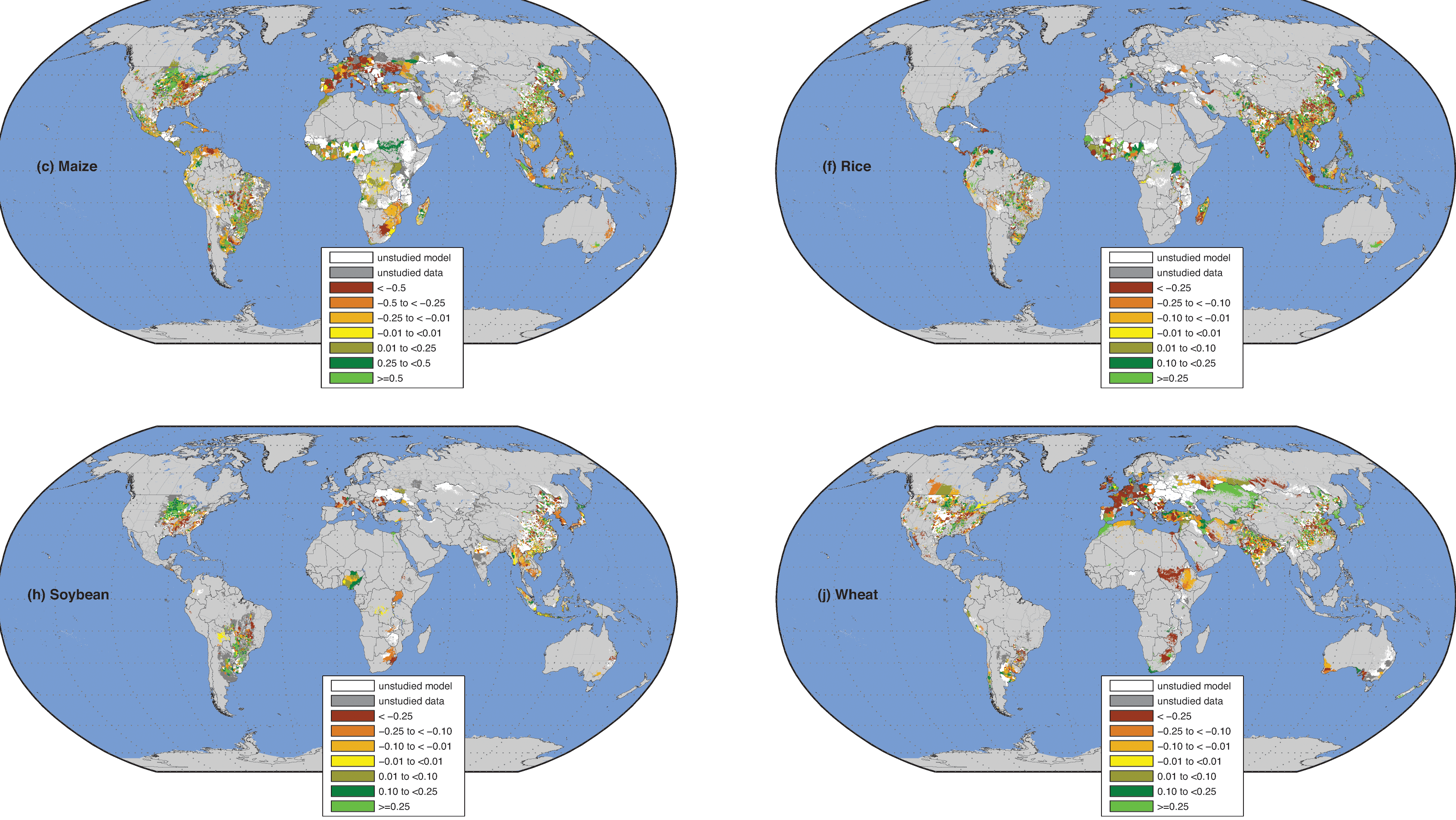
The already observed effects of climate change on the production of four major crops.

According to the IPCC Sixth Assessment Report from 2022, there is high confidence that in and of itself, climate change to date has left primarily negative effects on both crop yields and quality of produce, although there has been some regional variation: more negative effects have been observed for some crops in low-latitudes (maize and wheat), while positive effects of climate change have been observed in some crops in high-latitudes (maize, wheat, and sugar beets). I.e. during the period 1981 to 2008, global warming has had negative effects on wheat yield in especially tropical regions, with decreases in average global yields by 5.5%. A study in 2019 tracked ~20,000 political units globally for 10 crops (maize, rice, wheat, soybean, barley, cassava, oil palm, rapeseed, sorghum and sugarcane), providing more detail on the spatial resolution and a larger number of crops than previously studied. It found that crop yields across Europe, sub-Saharan Africa, and Australia had in general decreased because of climate change (compared to the baseline value of 2004–2008 average data), though exceptions are present. The effect of global climate change on yields of different crops from climate trends ranged from −13.4% (oil palm) to 3.5% (soybean). The study also showed that effects are generally positive in Latin America. Effects in Asia and Northern and Central America are mixed. Recent empirical research finds that each 1°C increase in global mean surface temperature could reduce global staple crop production by about 5.5x10^14 kcal annually (≈120kcal/person/day, or ~4.4% of recommended consumption), even after accounting for adaptation and income growth, with only about one-quarter of losses mitigated by mid-century. (Hultgren et al., 2025)

While the Green Revolution had ensured the growth of overall crop production per land area of 250% to 300% since the 1960, with around 44% attributed to newer crop varieties alone, it is believed this growth would have been even greater without the counteracting role of climate change on major crop yields over the same period. Between 1961 and 2021, global agricultural productivity could have been 21% greater than it actually was, if it did not have to contend with climate change. Such shortfalls would have affected food security of vulnerable populations the most: a study in 2019 showed that climate change has already increased the risk of food insecurity in many food insecure countries. Even in developed countries such as Australia, extreme weather associated with climate change has been found to cause a wide range of cascading spillovers through supply chain disruption, in addition to its primary effect on fruit, vegetable, and livestock sectors and the rural communities reliant on them.

Between 1961 and 1985, cereal production more than doubled in developing nations, largely due to the development of irrigation, fertilizer, and seed varieties. Even in the absence of further scientific/technological developments, many of the existing advancements have not been evenly distributed, and their spread from the developed world to the developing world is expected to drive some improvements on its own. Further, agricultural expansion has slowed down in the recent years, but this trend is widely expected to reverse in the future in order to maintain the global food supply under all but the most optimistic climate change scenarios consistent with the Paris Agreement.

=== Generalized yield projections ===
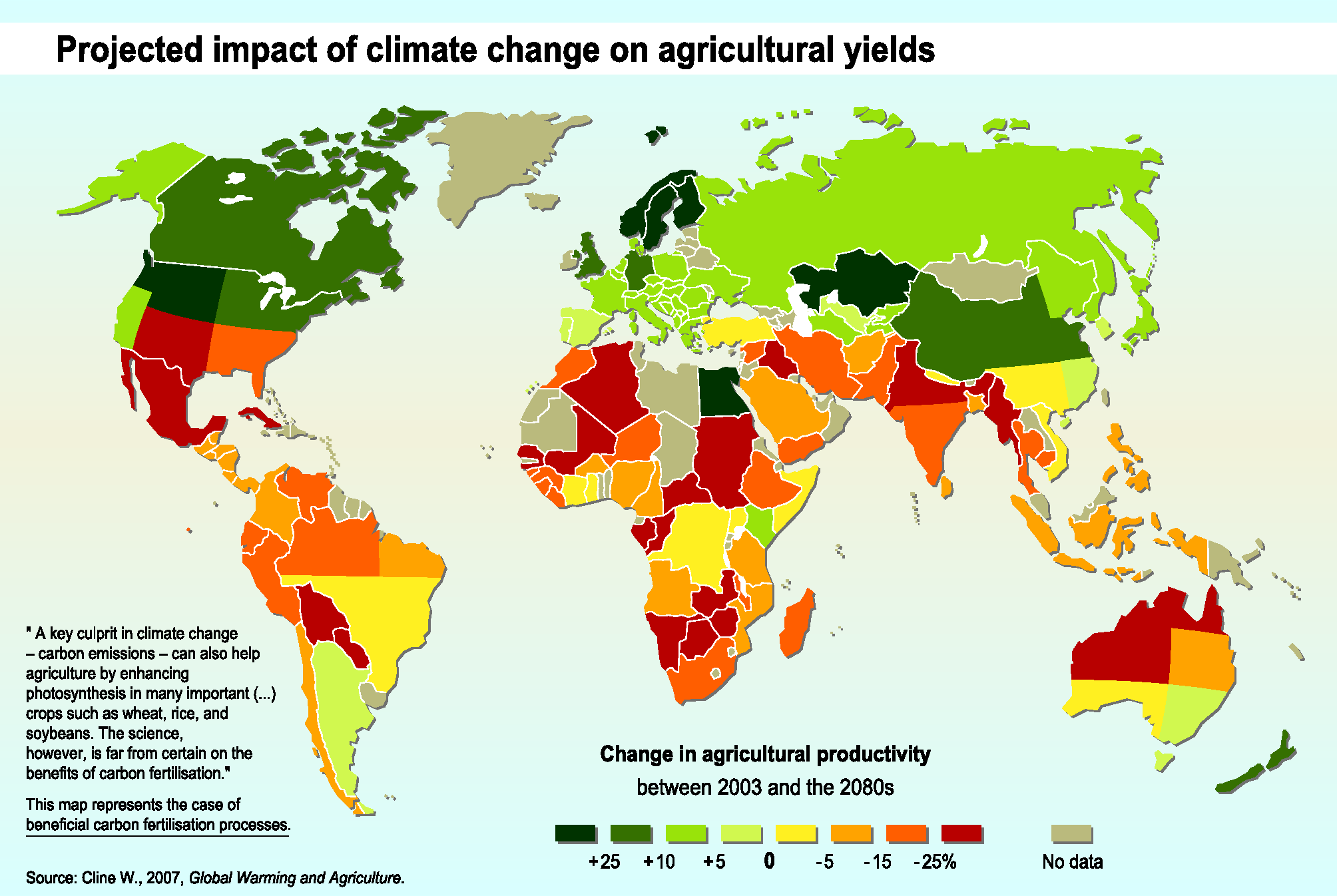
Map of predicted climate change effects on agricultural yields between 2003 and 2080 (data from 2007).

In 2007, the IPCC Fourth Assessment Report had suggested that global production potential would increase up to around 3 °C (5.4 °F) of globally averaged warming, as productivity increases for cereals in high latitudes would outweigh decreases in the low latitudes and global aggregate yields of rain-fed agriculture would increase by 5–20% in the first half of the 21st century. Warming exceeding this level would very likely see global declines in yields. Since then, subsequent reports had been more negative on the global production potential.

The US National Research Council assessed the literature on the effects of climate change on crop yields in 2011, and provided central estimates for key crops. A meta-analysis in 2014 revealed consensus that yield is expected to decrease in the second half of the century, and with greater effect in tropical than temperate regions.

A 2024 comprehensive review by Yuan et al. found that, under high-emission scenarios without adaptation, the combined effects of rising temperatures, altered precipitation patterns and increased evapotranspiration are projected to reduce yields of the four staple cereals (maize, rice, wheat and soybean) by approximately 5–10 % by mid-century.

=== Effects on yields for four major crops ===
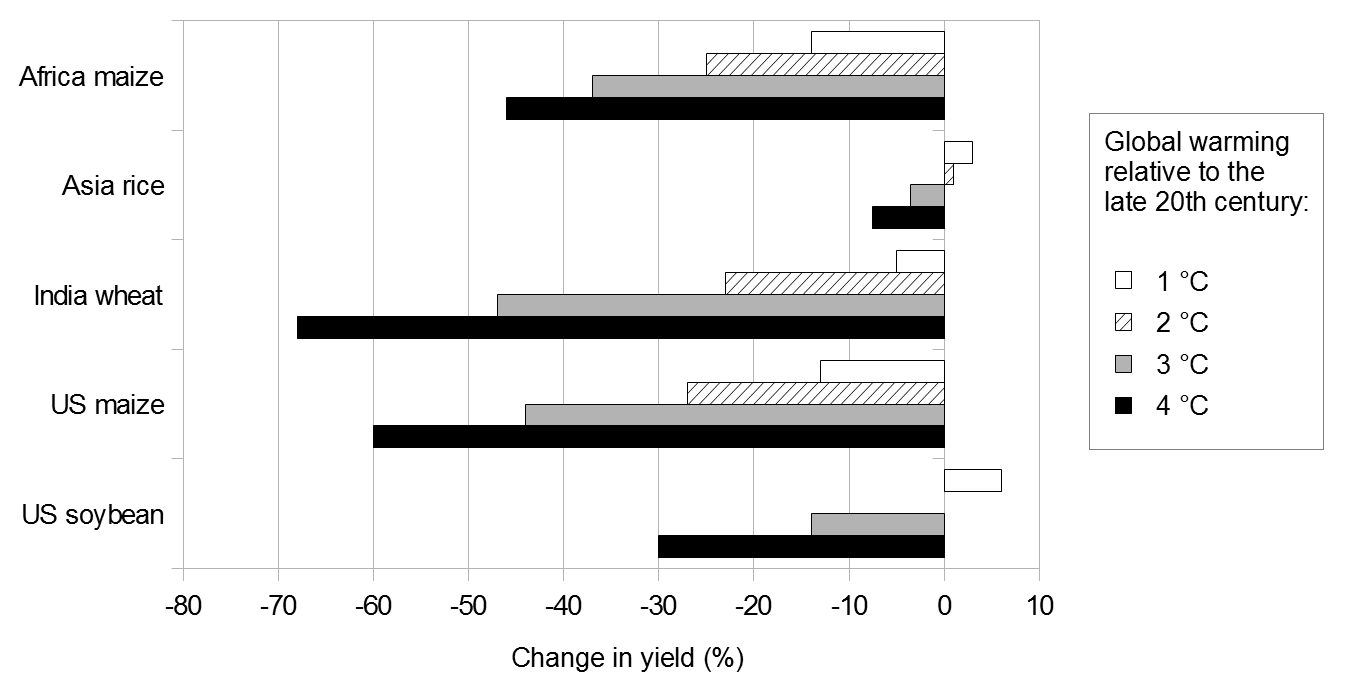
US National Research Council projections of climate change effects on the most important crops.

There is a large number of agricultural crops, but not all of them are equally important. Most climate change assessments focus on "four major crops" – maize (corn), rice, wheat and soybeans– which are consumed directly and indirectly, as animal feed (the main purpose of soybeans). The three cereals are collectively responsible for half of the total human calorie intake, and together with soybeans, they account for two thirds. Different methods have been used to project future yields of these crops, and by 2019, the consensus was that warming would lead to aggregate declines of the four. Maize and soybean would decrease with any warming, whereas rice and wheat production might peak at 3 °C (5.4 °F) of warming.

In 2021, a paper which used an ensemble of 21 climate models estimated that under the most intense climate change scenario used at the time, RCP8.5, global yields of these four crops would decline by between 3–12% around 2050 and by 11–25% by the year 2100. The losses were concentrated in what are currently the major agricultural producers and exporters. For instance, even by 2050, some agricultural areas of Australia, Brazil, South Africa, Southeast China, Southern Europe and the United States would suffer production losses of mostly maize and soybeans exceeding 25%. A similar finding - that some major "breadbaskets" would begin to see unequivocal effects of climate change, both positive and negative, before the year 2040 - had been established in another study from the same year. Since it represents the worst-case scenario of continually increasing emissions with no efforts to reduce them, RCP8.5 is often considered unrealistic, and a less intense RCP4.5 scenario (which still leads to nearly 3 °C (5.4 °F) by century's end, far in excess of the Paris Agreement goals) is now usually considered a better match for the current trajectory.

In addition, reduced crop yields have the potential to increase food prices and negatively affect agricultural prosperity world-wide, with a 0.3% annual loss in prospective global GDP by 2100. This will negatively impact the means of subsistence for millions of people particularly in South Asian Nations. Over 70% of people in the Asian region depend on agriculture for their livelihood, it employs nearly 60 percent of the workforce and provides 22% of the gross domestic product (GDP) for the area.

==== Maize ====
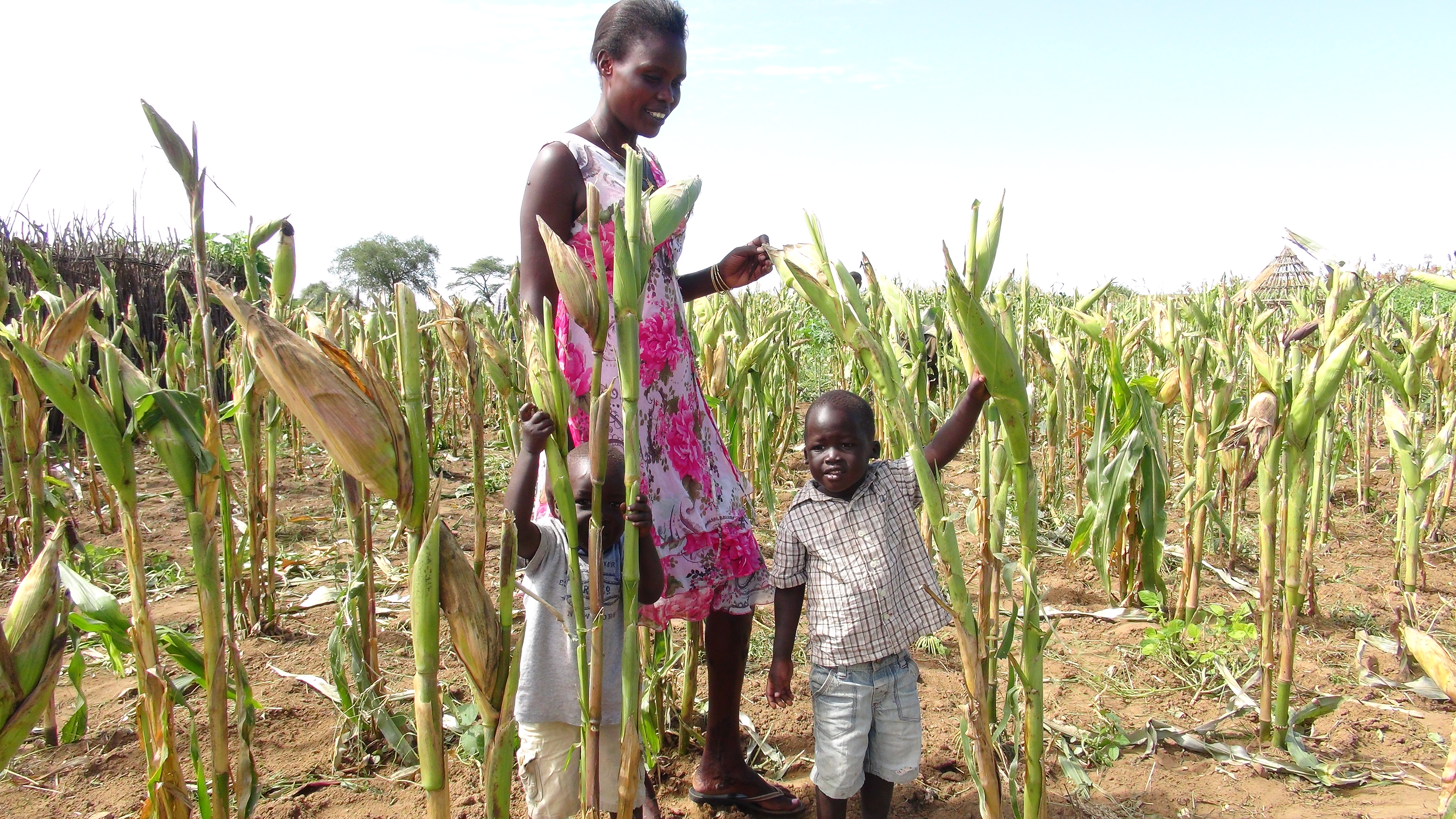
Maize farming in Uganda is made more difficult due to heat waves and droughts worsened by climate change in Uganda.

Out of the four crops, maize is considered the most vulnerable to warming, with one meta-analysis concluding that every 1 °C (1.8 °F) of global warming reduces maize yields by 7.4%.

It is also a C4 carbon fixation plant, meaning that it experiences little benefit from the increased CO_{2} levels. When the results from modelling experiments comparing the combined output of latest earth system models and dedicated agricultural crop models were published in 2021, the most notable new finding was the substantial reduction in projected global yields of maize. While the previous generation suggested that under the low-warming scenario, maize productivity would increase by around 5% by the end of the century, the latest had shown a reduction of 6% under the equivalent scenario, SSP1-2.6. Under the high-emission SSP5-8.5, there was a global decline of 24% by 2100, as opposed to the earlier suggestion of a 1% increase.

==== Rice ====
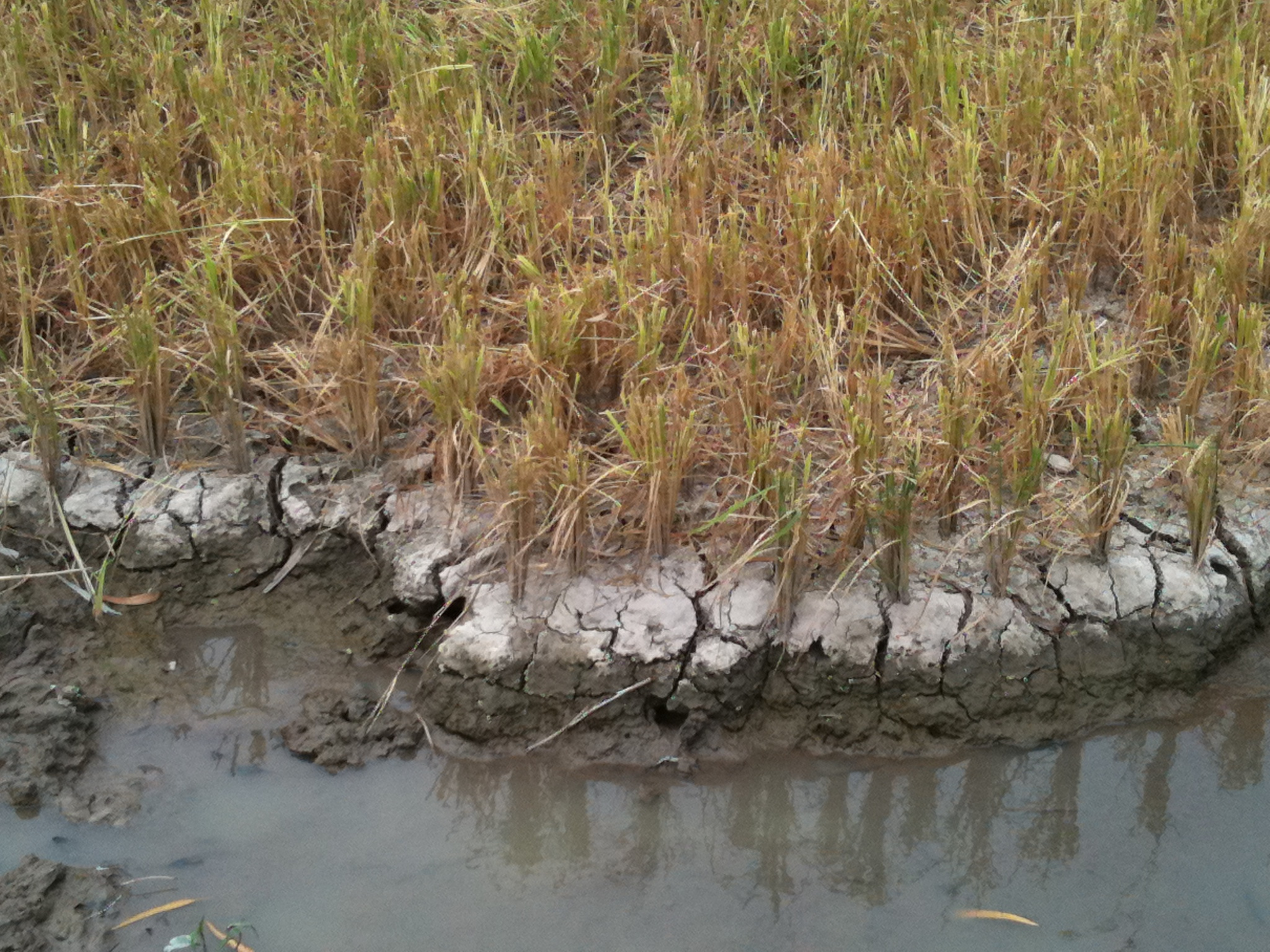
A rice field suffering from the effects of drought in Binh Thuy District, Can Tho, Vietnam.

Studies indicate that on their own, temperature changes reduce global rice yields by 3.2% for every 1 °C (1.8 °F) of global warming. Projections become more complicated once the changes in precipitation, CO_{2} fertilization effect and other factors need to be taken into account: for instance, climate effects on rice growth in East Asia had been a net positive so far, although 2023 research suggested that by the end of the century, China could lose up to 8% of its rice yield due to increases in extreme rainfall events alone. As of 2021, global projections of rice yields from the most advanced climate and agricultural models were less consistent than they were for wheat and maize, and less able to identify a clear statistically significant trend.

Predictions of climate change's effects on rice cultivation vary. Global rice yield has been projected to decrease by around 3.2% with each 1°C increase in global average temperature while another study predicts global rice cultivation will increase initially, plateauing at about 3°C warming (2091–2100 relative to 1850–1900).

The impacts of climate change on rice cultivation vary across geographic location and socioeconomic context. For example, rising temperatures and decreasing solar radiation during the later years of the 20th century decreased rice yield by between 10% and 20% across 200 farms in seven Asian countries. This may have been caused by increased night-time respiration. IRRI has predicted that Asian rice yields will fall by some 20% per 1°C rise in global mean temperature. Further, rice is unable to yield grain if the flowers experience a temperature of 35°C or more for over one hour, so the crop would be lost under these conditions.

In the Po Valley in Italy, the arborio and carnaroli risotto rice varieties have suffered poor harvests through drought in the 21st century. The Ente Nazionale Risi is developing drought-resistant varieties; its nuovo prometeo variety has deep roots that enable it to tolerate drought, but is not suitable for risotto.

==== Wheat ====
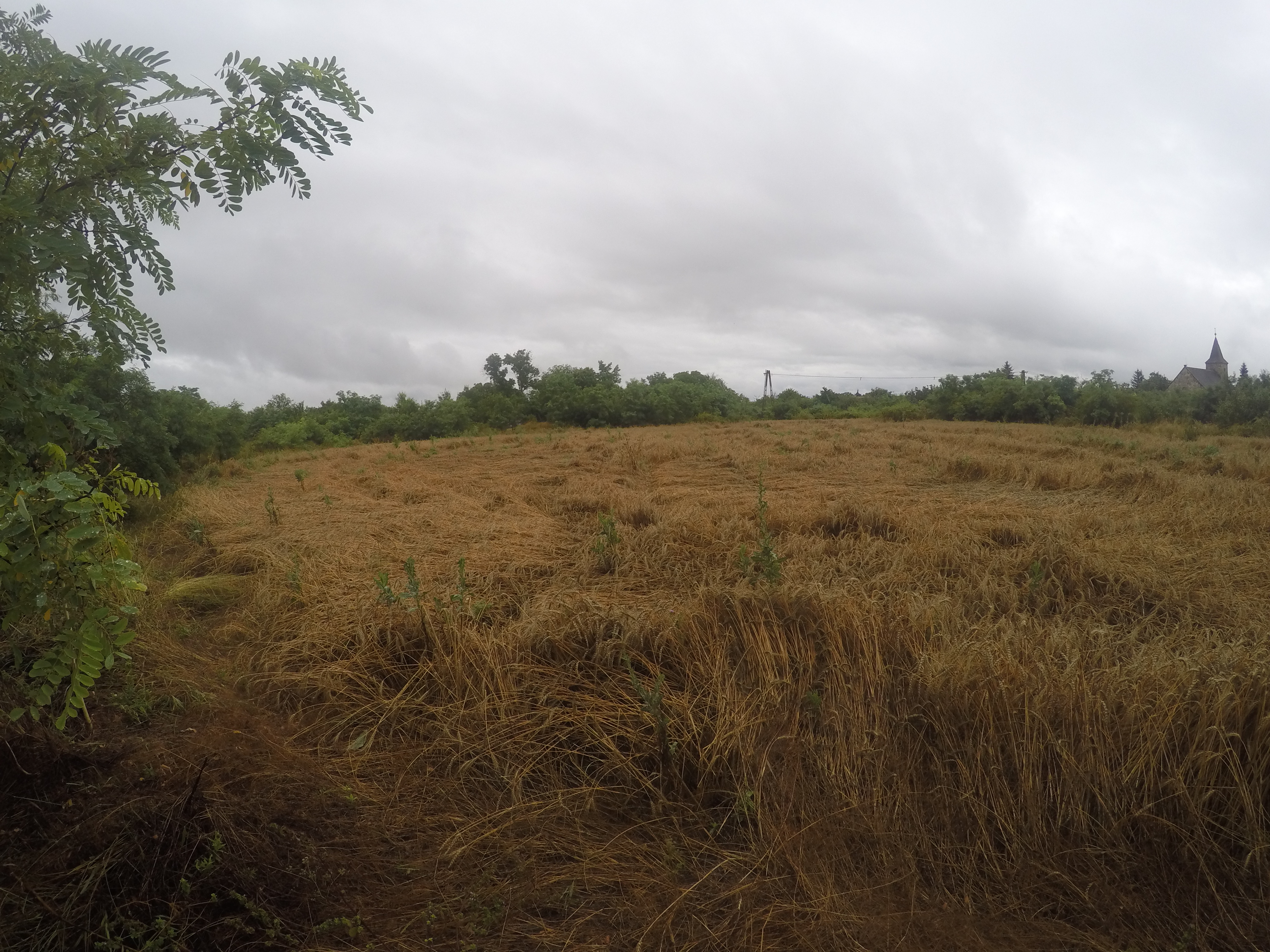
Wheat field in Hungary which had been affected by heavy rainfall in 2016.

Climate change effects on rainfed wheat will vary depending on the region and local climatic conditions. Studies in Iran surrounding changes in temperature and rainfall are representative for several different parts of the world since there exists a wide range of climatic conditions. They range from temperate to hot-arid to cold semi-arid. Scenarios based on increasing temperature by up to 2.5 °C (4.5 °F) and rainfall decreases by up to 25% show wheat grain yield losses can be significant. The losses can be as much as 45% in temperate areas and over 50% in hot-arid areas. But in cold semi-arid areas yields can be increased somewhat (about 15%). Adaptation strategies with the most promise center around dates for seed planting. Late planting in November to January can have significant positive effects on yields due to the seasonality of rainfall. However, those experiments did not consider the effects of CO_{2} increases.

Globally, temperature changes alone are expected to reduce annual wheat yield by 6% for every 1 °C (1.8 °F) of global warming. However, other factors such as precipitation and the CO_{2} fertilization effect benefit wheat yields far more. In November 2021, the results from modelling experiments comparing the combined output of latest earth system models and dedicated agricultural crop models were published. While it projected a consistent decrease in future global yields of maize, particularly under greater warming, it found the opposite for wheat yields. When the previous generation of models suggested a 9% increase in global wheat yields by 2100 under the high-emission scenario, the updated results indicate that under its highest-warming SSP5-8.5 scenario, they would increase by 18%. As per projections, heat-induced stress could potentially affect approximately half of the Indo-Gangetic Plains (IGP), making it unsuitable for the cultivation of wheat by 2050.

==== Soybeans ====
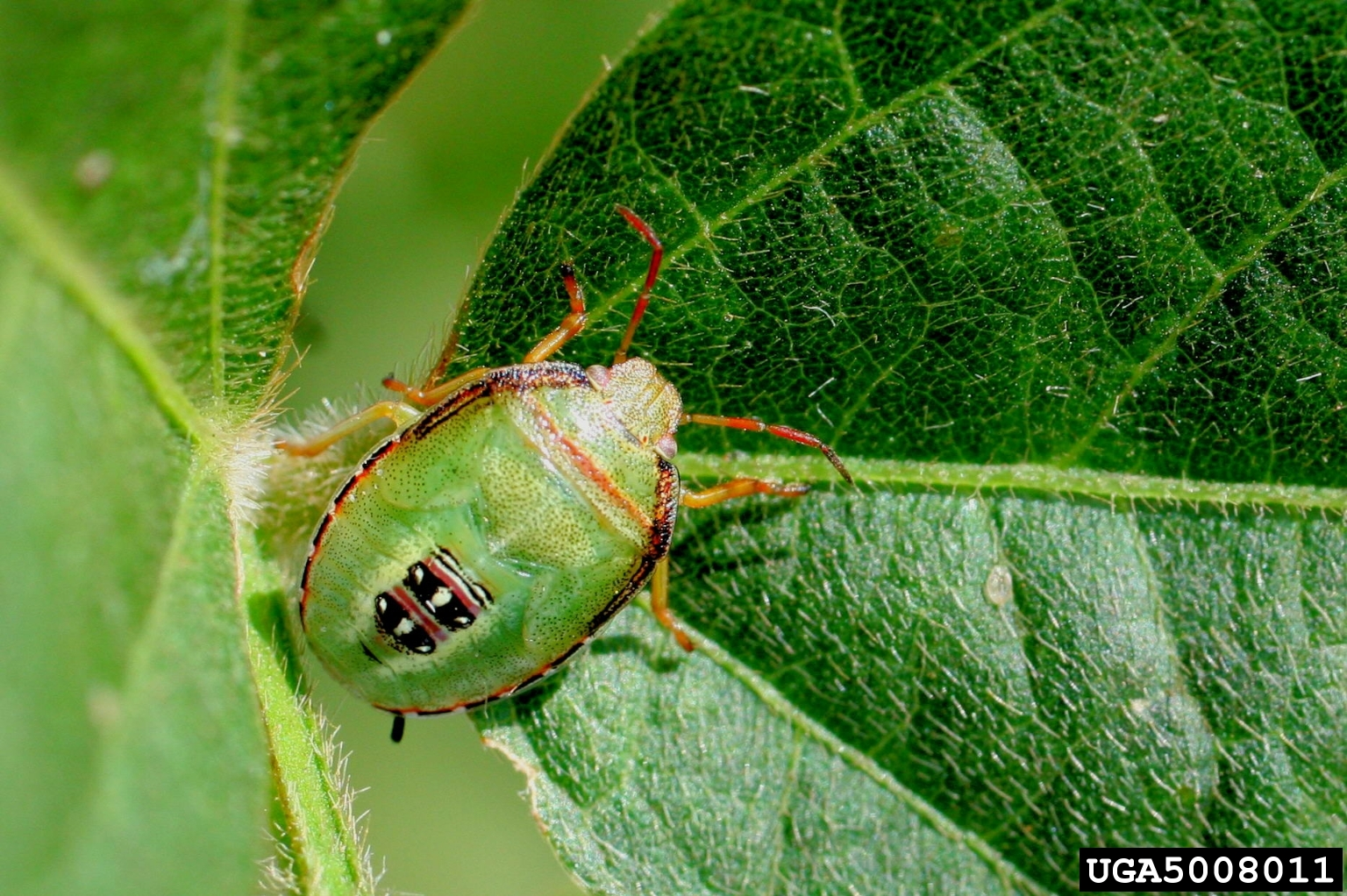
Piezodorus guildinii, commonly known as red-banded stink bug, is a notable soybean pest which is expected to spread further and cause more damage in response to climate change.

Studies have shown that when CO_{2} levels rise, soybean leaves are less nutritious; therefore plant-eating beetles have to eat more to get their required nutrients. In addition, soybeans are less capable of defending themselves against the predatory insects under high CO_{2}. The CO_{2} diminishes the plant's jasmonic acid production, an insect-killing poison that is excreted when the plant senses it is being attacked. Without this protection, beetles are able to eat the soybean leaves freely, resulting in a lower crop yield. This is not a problem unique to soybeans, and many plant species' defence mechanisms are impaired in a high CO_{2} environment.

Studies indicate that on their own, temperature changes reduce global soybean yields by 3.1% for every 1 °C (1.8 °F) of global warming. These projections become more complicated once the changes in precipitation, CO_{2} fertilization effect and other factors need to be taken into account: as of 2021, global projections of soybean yields from the most advanced climate and agricultural models were less able to establish a strong trend when compared to the projections for maize and wheat.

=== Other crops ===
Climate change induced by increasing greenhouse gases is likely to differ across crops and countries.

==== Millet and sorghum ====
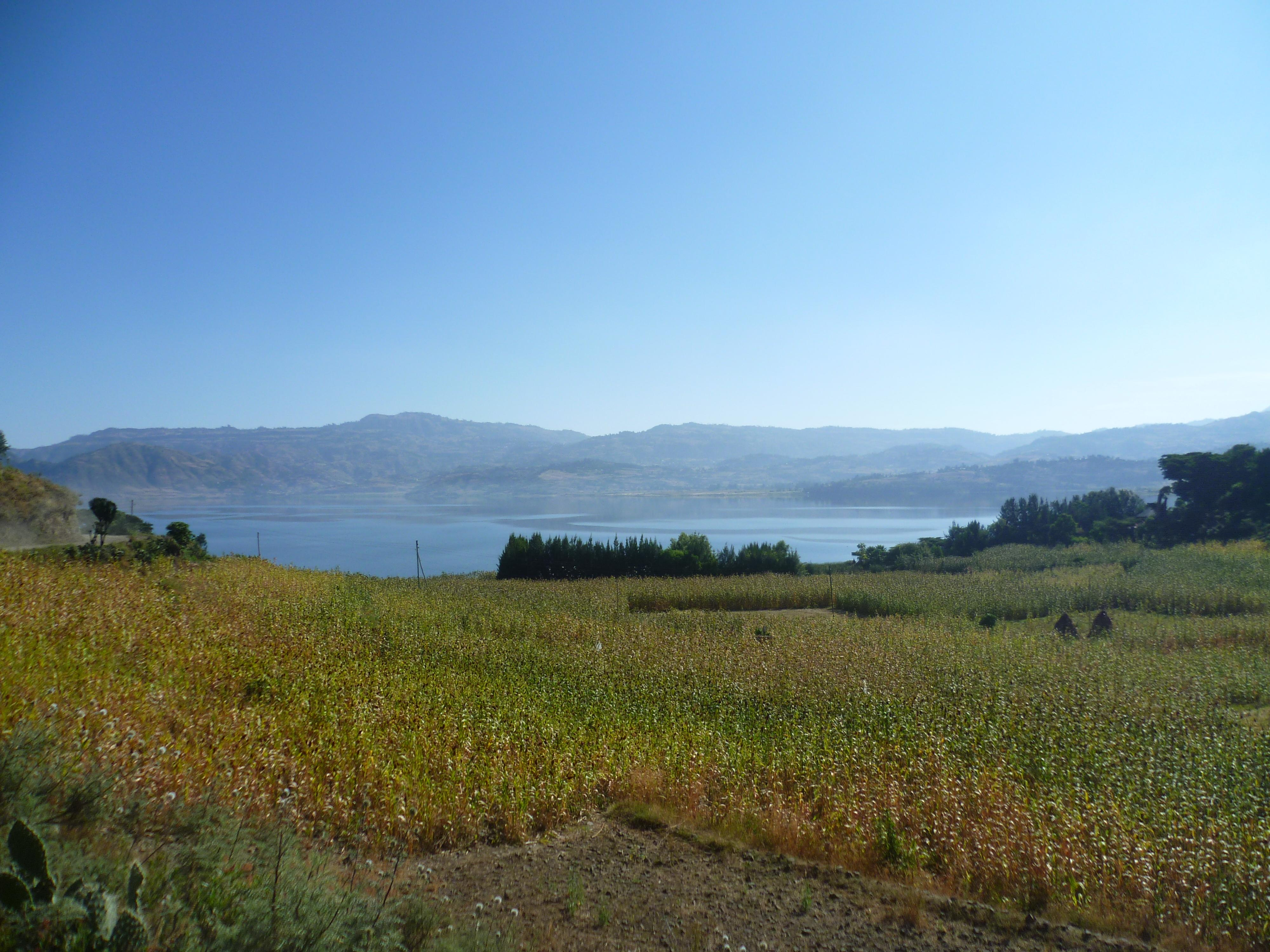
A sorghum field at the shores of Lake Hayq in Ethiopia.

Millet and sorghum are not as widely consumed as the four major crops, but they are crucial staples in many African countries. A paper published in the year 2022 found that under the highest-warming SSP5-8.5 scenario, changes in temperature and soil moisture would reduce the aggregate yields of millet, sorghum, maize and soybeans by between 9% and 32%, depending on the model. Notably, this was a less pessimistic result than in the earlier models, which the authors attributed to simulating soil moisture directly, rather than attempting to indirectly account for it by tracking precipitation changes caused by effects of climate change on the water cycle.

==== Lentils (besides soybeans) ====
Climate change induced drought stress in Africa will likely lead to a reduction in the nutritional quality of the common bean. This would primarily impact populations in poorer countries less able to compensate by eating more food, more varied diets, or possibly taking supplements.

==== Potatoes ====
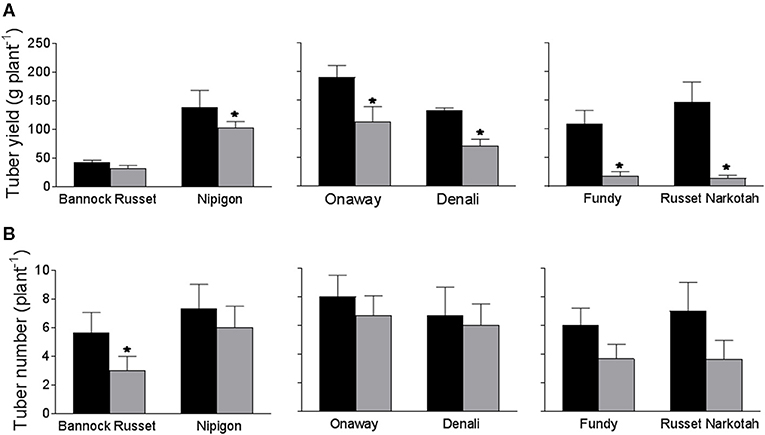
Response of six prominent potato varieties to drought conditions.

Potato plants and crop yields are predicted to benefit from the CO_{2} fertilization effect, which would increase photosynthetic rates and therefore growth, reduce water consumption through lower transpiration from stomata and increase starch content in the edible tubers. However, potatoes are more sensitive to soil water deficits than some other staple crops like wheat. In the UK, the amount of arable land suitable for rainfed potato production is predicted to decrease by at least 75%. These changes are likely to lead to increased demand for irrigation water, particularly during the potato growing season.

Potatoes grow best under temperate conditions. Temperatures above 30 °C (86 °F) have negative effects on potato crops, from physiological damage such as brown spots on tubers, to slower growth, premature sprouting, and lower starch content. These effects reduce crop yield, affecting both the number and the weight of tubers. As a result, areas where current temperatures are near the limits of potatoes' temperature range (e.g. much of sub-Saharan Africa) will likely suffer large reductions in potato crop yields in the future. On the other hand, low temperatures reduce potato growth and present risk of frost damage.

As well as affecting potatoes directly, climate change will also affect the distributions and populations of many potato diseases and pests. For instance, late blight is predicted to become a greater threat in some areas (e.g. in Finland) and become a lesser threat in others (e.g. in the United Kingdom Altogether, one 2003 estimate suggests that future (2040–2069) worldwide potato yield would be 18–32% lower than it was at the time, driven by declines in hotter areas like Sub-Saharan Africa, unless farmers and potato cultivars can adapt to the new environment.

==== Grapevines (wine production) ====
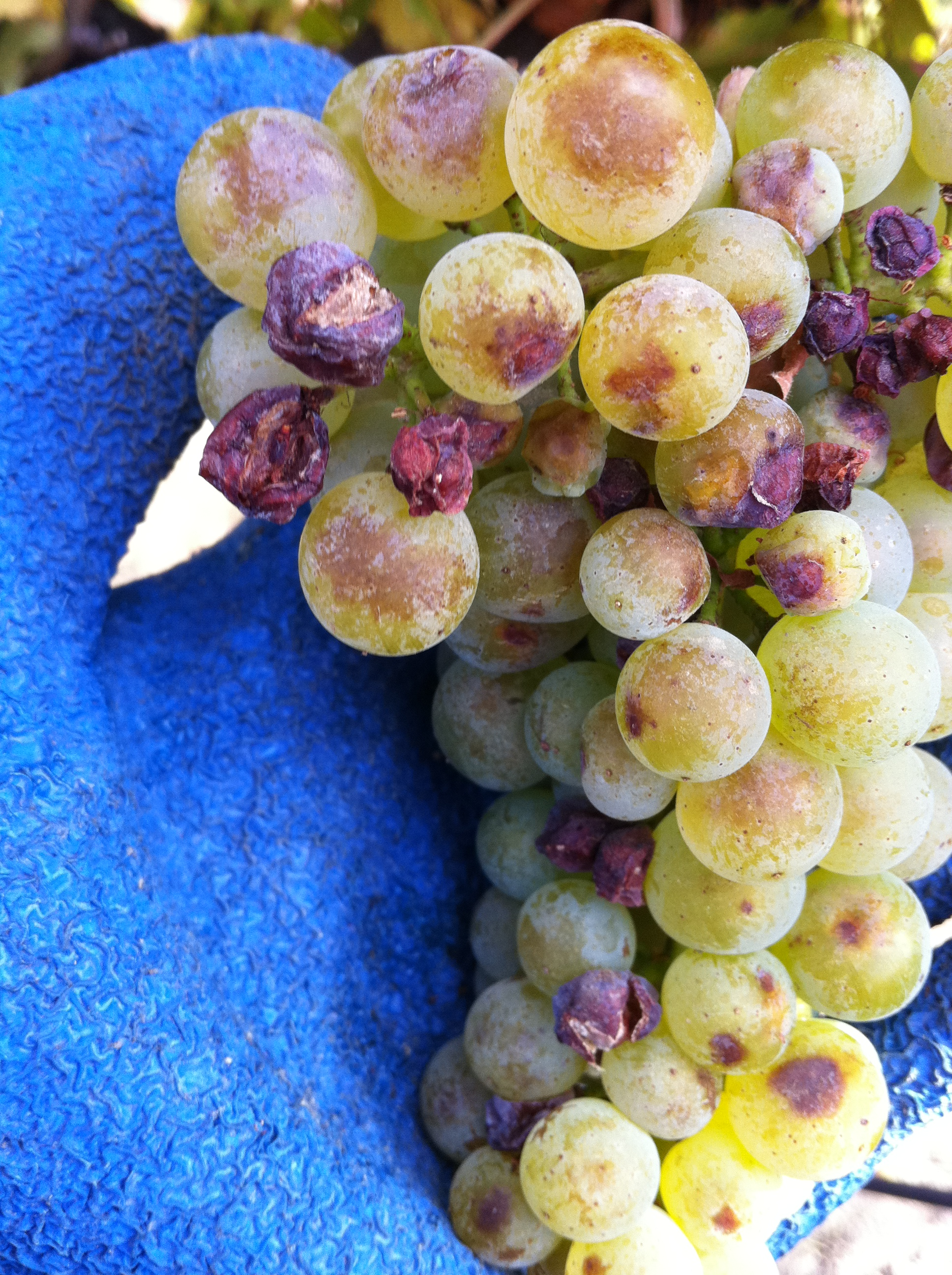
Chardonnay grapes which had been damaged by heat from sunburn

Grapevines are very responsive to their surrounding environment with a seasonal variation in yield of 32.5%. Climate is one of the key controlling factors in grape and wine production, affecting the suitability of certain grape varieties to a particular region as well as the type and quality of the wine produced. Wine composition is largely dependent on the mesoclimate and the microclimate and this means that for high quality wines to be produced, a climate-soil-variety equilibrium has to be maintained. The interaction between climate-soil-variety will in some cases come under threat from the effects of climate change. Identification of genes underlying phenological variation in grape may help to maintain consistent yield of particular varieties in future climatic conditions.

The gradually increasing temperatures will lead to a shift in suitable growing regions. It is estimated that the northern boundary of European viticulture will shift north 10 to 30 kilometres (6.2 to 18.6 mi) per decade up to 2020 with a doubling of this rate predicted between 2020 and 2050. This has positive and negative effects, as it opens doors to new cultivars being grown in certain regions but a loss of suitability of other cultivars and may also risk production quality and quantity in general.

== Effects on livestock rearing ==
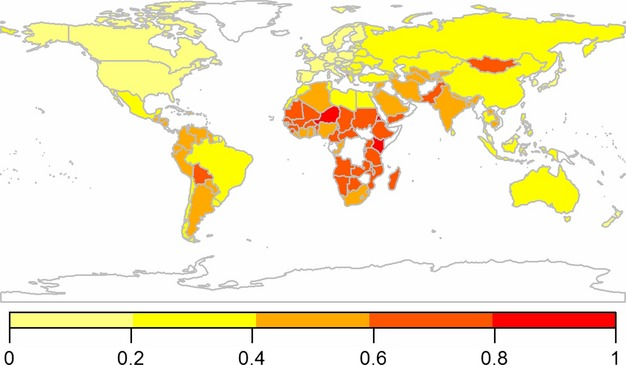
A map of countries considered most and least vulnerable to adverse impacts of climate change on their grazing livestock

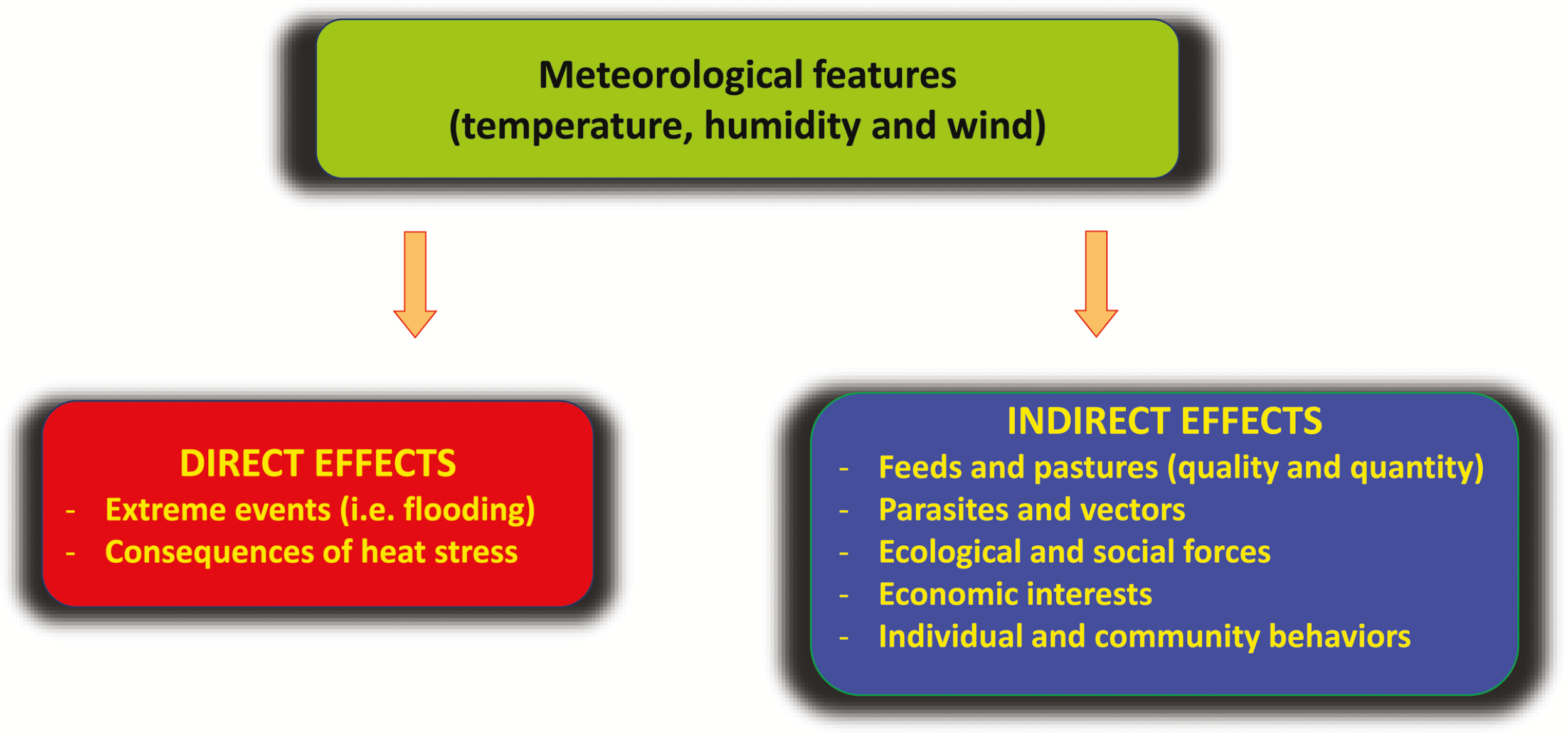
Multi-faceted impacts of climate change on livestock

There are numerous interlinked effects of climate change on livestock rearing. This activity is both heavily affected by and a substantial driver of anthropogenic climate change due to its greenhouse gas emissions. As of 2011, some 400 million people relied on livestock in some way to secure their livelihood. The commercial value of this sector is estimated as close to $1 trillion. As an outright end to human consumption of meat and animal products is not currently considered a realistic goal, any comprehensive adaptation to effects of climate change must also consider livestock.

The observed adverse impacts on livestock production include increased heat stress in all but the coldest nations. This causes both mass animal mortality during heatwaves, and the sublethal impacts, such as lower quantity of quality of products like milk, greater vulnerability to conditions like lameness or even impaired reproduction. Another impact concerns reduced quantity or quality of animal feed, whether due to drought or as a secondary impact of CO2 fertilization effect. Difficulties with growing feed could reduce worldwide livestock headcounts by 7–10% by midcentury. Animal parasites and vector-borne diseases are also spreading further than they had before, and the data indicating this is frequently of superior quality to one used to estimate impacts on the spread of human pathogens.

While some areas which currently support livestock animals are expected to avoid "extreme heat stress" even with high warming at the end of the century, others may stop being suitable as early as midcentury. In general, sub-Saharan Africa is considered to be the most vulnerable region to food security shocks caused by the impacts of climate change on their livestock, as over 180 million people across those nations are expected to see significant declines in suitability of their rangelands around midcentury. On the other hand, Japan, the United States and nations in Europe are considered the least vulnerable. This is as much a product of pre-existing differences in human development index and other measures of national resilience and widely varying importance of pastoralism to the national diet as it is an outcome of direct impacts of climate on each country.

== Global food security and undernutrition ==
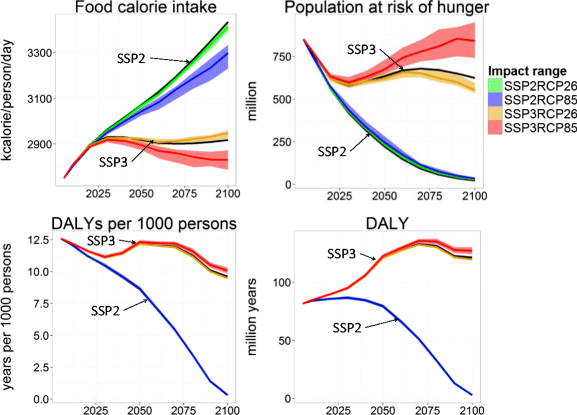
Projected changes in average food availability (represented as calorie consumption per capita), population at risk of hunger and disability-adjusted life years under two Shared Socioeconomic Pathways: the baseline, SSP2, and SSP3, scenario of high global rivalry and conflict. The red and the orange lines show projections for SSP3 assuming high and low intensity of future emissions and the associated climate change.

Scientific understanding of how climate change would affect global food security has evolved over time. The latest IPCC Sixth Assessment Report in 2022 suggested that by 2050, the number of people at risk of hunger will increase under all scenarios by between 8 and 80 million people, with nearly all of them in Sub-Saharan Africa, South Asia and Central America. However, this comparison was done relative to a world where no climate change had occurred, and so it does not rule out the possibility of an overall reduction in hunger risk when compared to present-day conditions.

The earlier Special Report on Climate Change and Land suggested that under a relatively high emission scenario (RCP6.0), cereals may become 1–29% more expensive in 2050 depending on the socioeconomic pathway. Compared to a scenario where climate change is absent, this would put between 1–181 million people with low income at risk of hunger.

It is difficult to project the effect of climate change on utilization (protecting food against spoilage, being healthy enough to absorb nutrients, etc.). In 2016, a modelling study suggested that by mid-century, the most intense climate change scenario would reduce per capita global food availability by 3.2%, with a 0.7% decrease in red meat consumption and a 4% decrease in fruit and vegetable consumption. According to its numbers, 529,000 people would die between 2010 and 2050 as the result, primarily in South Asia and East Asia: two-thirds of those deaths would be caused by the lack of micronutrients from reduced fruit and vegetable supply, rather than outright starvation. Acting to slow climate change would reduce these projections by up to 71%. Food prices are also expected to become more volatile.

As of 2017, around 821 million people had suffered from hunger. This was equivalent to about 11% of the world population: regionally, this included 23.2% of sub-Saharan Africa, 16.5% of the Caribbean and 14.8% of South Asia. In 2021, 720 million to 811 million people were considered undernourished in 2021 (of whom 200,000, 32.3 million and 112.3 million people were at a "catastrophic", "emergency" and "crisis" levels of food insecurity, respectively).

In 2020, research suggested that the baseline projected level of socioeconomic development (Shared Socioeconomic Pathway 2) would reduce this number to 122 million globally by 2050, even as the population grows to reach 9.2 billion. The effect of climate change would at most increase this 2050 figure by around 80 million, and the negative effect could be reduced to 20 million through enabling easier food trade with measures such as eliminating tariffs.

In 2021, a meta-analysis of 57 studies on food security was more pessimistic, suggesting that the year 2050 population at risk of hunger would be around 500 million under SSP2. Some variations of Shared Socioeconomic Pathways with high climate change and a lack of equitable global development instead resulted in an outright increase of global hunger by up to 30% from its 2010 levels.

For the earlier IPCC Fourth Assessment Report in 2007, the analysis of four main SRES pathways had shown with medium confidence (about 50% certainty)) that trends of social and economic development in three of them (A1, B1, B2) would see the number of undernourished people decline to 100–130 million people by the year 2080, while trends in A2 projected 770 million undernourished – similar to the contemporary (early 21st century) figures of ~700 million people. Once the effect of climate change implied by those scenarios was taken into account, A1, B1 and B2 scenarios would see 100–380 million undernourished by 2080 (still a major decline in hunger from 2006 levels), and A2 would see 740–1,300 million, although there was only low (20% certainty) to medium certainty in these figures. Sub-Saharan Africa would likely overtake Asia as the world's most food-insecure region, primarily due to differing socioeconomic trends.

=== Effects of extreme weather and synchronized crop failures ===
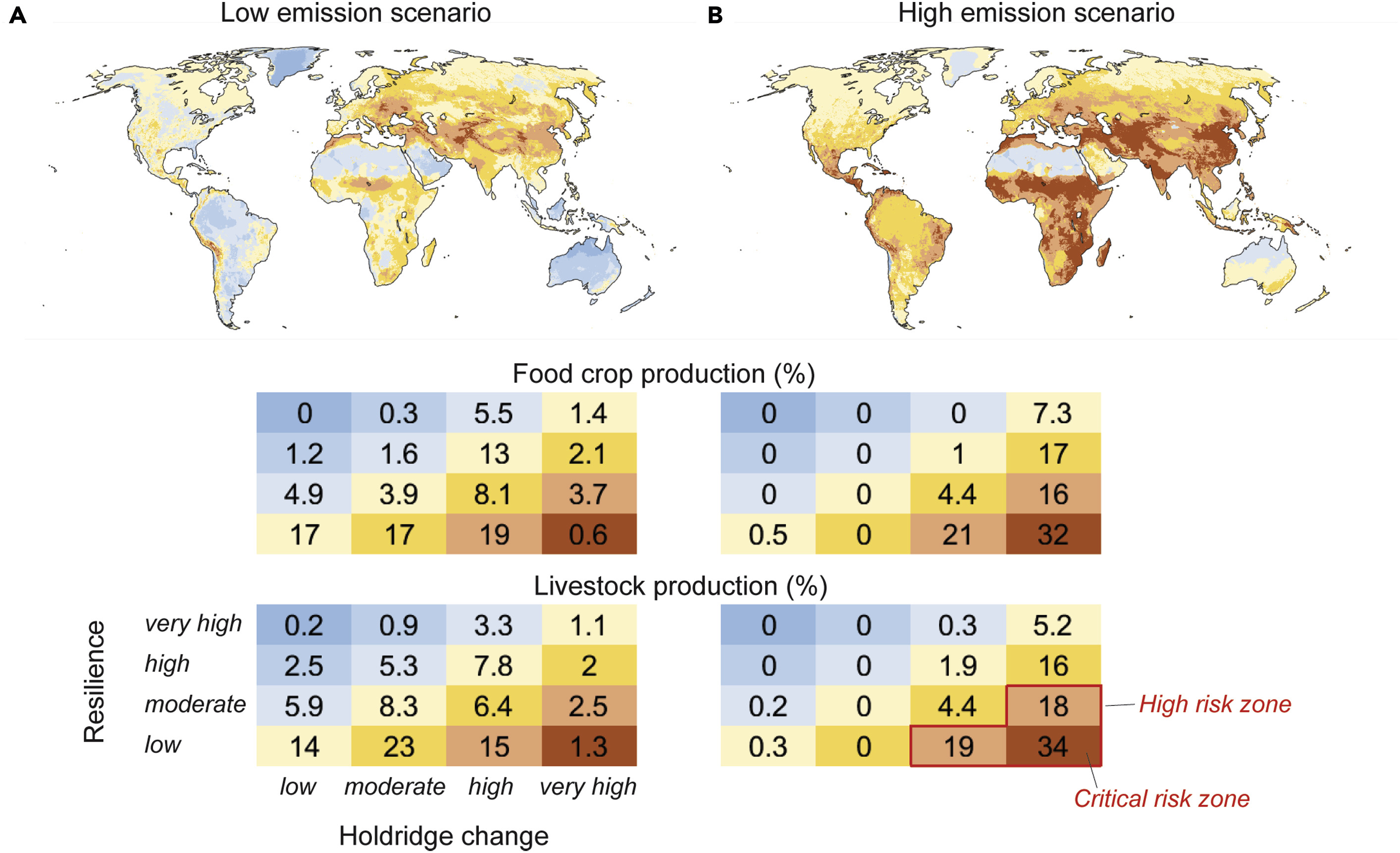
Areas of the globe where agriculture would become more difficult perhaps to the point of leaving the conditions historically suitable for it, under low-emission and high-emission scenarios, by 2100.

Some scientists consider the aforementioned projections of crop yields and food security of limited use, because in their view, they primarily model climate change as a change in mean climate state, and are not as well-equipped to consider climatic extremes. For instance, a paper published in 2021 had also attempted to calculate the number of people facing hunger in 2050 – but now on the assumption that a climate event with a 1% (i.e. once in 100 years) likelihood of occurring in the new climate (meaning it would have been effectively impossible in the present climate) were to impact that year. It estimated that such an event would increase the baseline number by 11–33% even in the low-emission scenario, and by 20–36% in the high-emission one. If such an event were to affect more vulnerable regions like South Asia, then they would have required triple their 2021 level of known food reserves to absorb the blow.

Notably, other papers show that simulating recent historical extreme events in climate models, such as the 2003 European heatwave, typically results in lower effects than what had been observed in the real world, indicating that the effects of future extreme events are also likely to be underestimated.

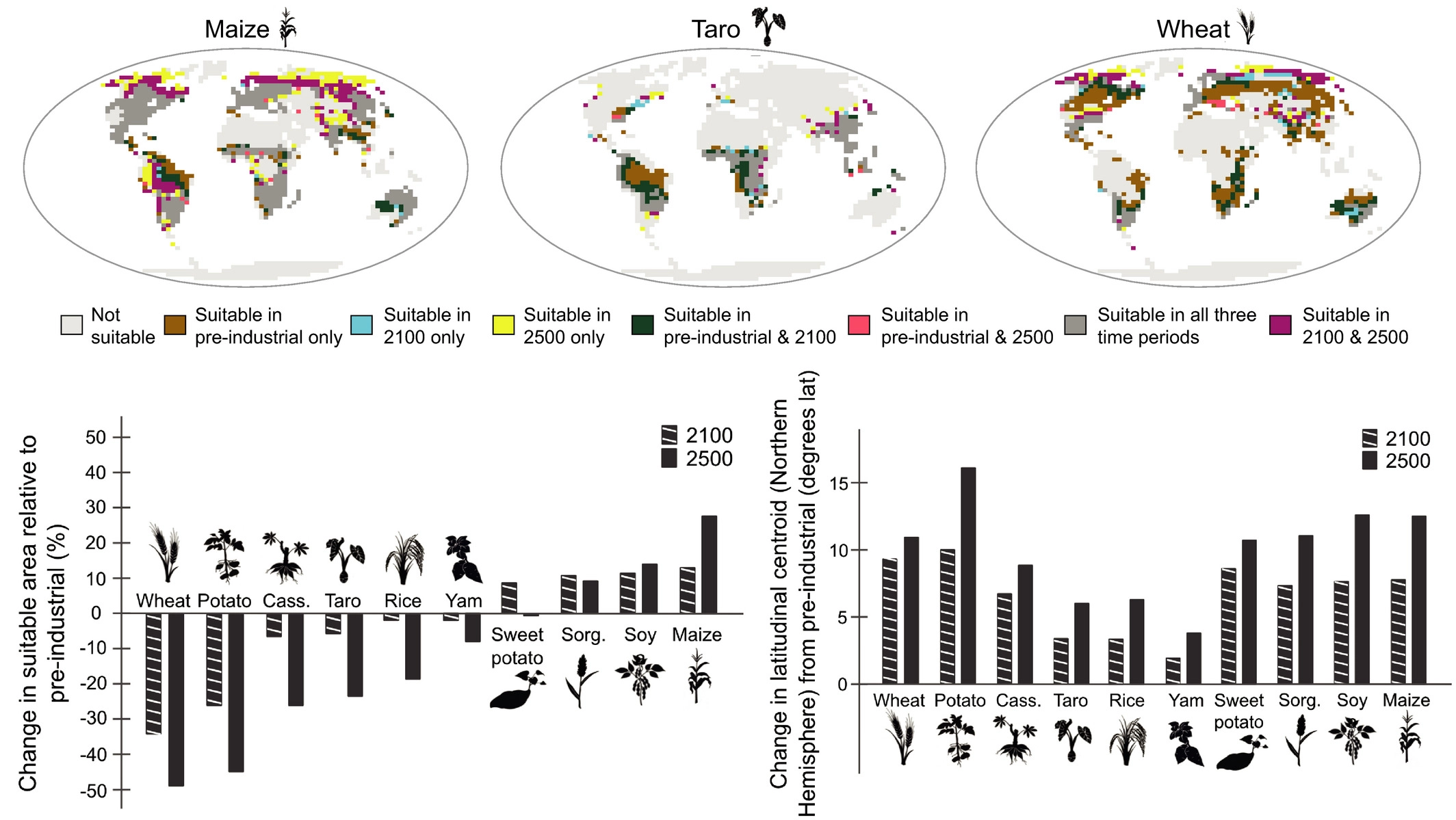
Projections of crop yields for seven key crops in year 2100 and year 2500 under the second-highest warming scenario, RCP6.0. (Research from 2021.)

The difference between climatic mean and extremes may be particularly important for determining areas where agriculture may stop being viable. In 2021, a research team aimed to extend climate model projections of mean changes in temperature and the water cycle to the year 2500. They suggested that under the second-strongest warming scenario RCP6.0, land area capable of supporting four major temperate crops (maize, potato, soybean and wheat) would become about 11% smaller by 2100 and 18.3% smaller by 2500, while for major tropical crops (cassava, rice, sweet potato, sorghum, taro, and yam), it would decline by only 2.3% around 2100, yet by around 15% by 2500. Under the low-emission scenario RCP2.6, changes are much smaller, with around 3% decline in suitable land area for temperate crops by 2500 and an equivalent gain for tropical crops by then.

Yet, another paper from 2021 suggested that by 2100, under the high-emission SSP5-8.5, 31% and 34% of the current crop and livestock production would leave what the authors have defined as a "safe climatic space": that is, those areas (most of South Asia and the Middle East, as well as parts of sub-Saharan Africa and Central America) would experience very rapid shift in Holdridge life zones (HLZ) and associated weather, while also being low in social resilience. Notably, a similar fraction of global crop and livestock production would also experience a large change in HLZ, but in more developed areas which would have better chances of adapting. In contrast, under the low-emissions SSP1-2.6, 5% and 8% of crop and livestock production would leave what is defined as the safe climatic space.

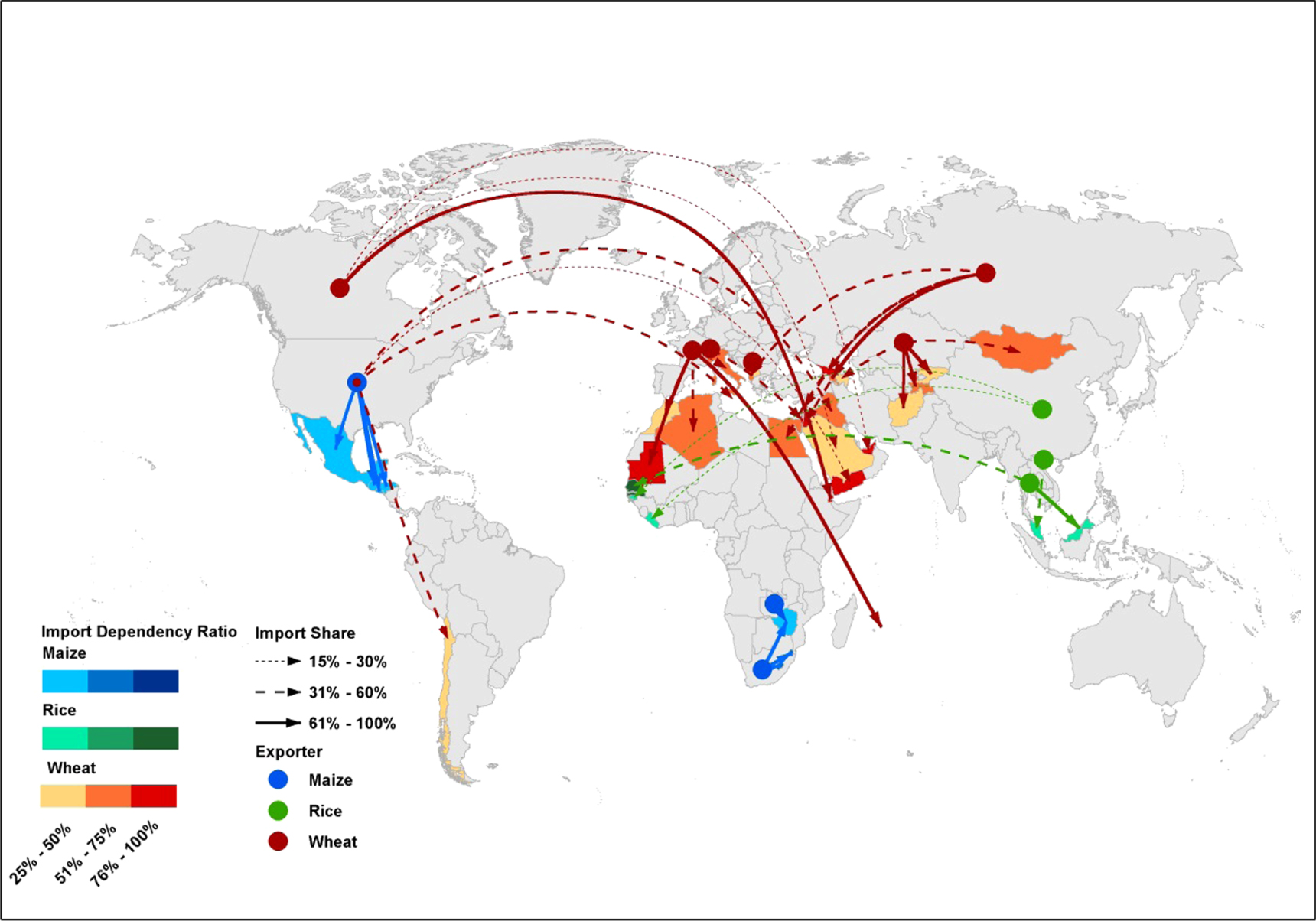
Certain countries around the world are particularly dependent on imports from specific exporters, leaving them the most vulnerable to crop failures in those countries.

Also in 2021, it was suggested that the high-emission scenario would result in a 4.5-fold increase in the probability of breadbasket failures (defined as a yield loss of 10% or more) by 2030, which could then increase 25 times by 2050. This corresponds to reaching 1.5 °C (2.7 °F) and 2 °C (3.6 °F) thresholds under that scenario: earlier research suggested that for maize, this would increase risks for multiple simultaneous breadbasket failures (yield loss of 10% or more) from 6% under the late-20th century climate to 40% and 54%, respectively.

Some countries are particularly dependent on imports from certain exporters, meaning that a crop failure in those countries would hit them disproportionately. I.e. a ban on export of staple crops from Russia, Thailand and the United States alone would place around 200 million people (90% from Sub-Saharan Africa) at risk of starvation.

Additionally, there is the issue of representing synchronization - where extreme climate events happen to strike multiple important producer regions around the same time. It was estimated that if hypothetically, every region with a synchronized growing season were to experience crop failure at the same time, it would cause losses of four major crops between 17% and 34%. More realistically, analysis of historic data suggested that there have already been synchronized climate events associated with up to 20% yield losses.

According to a 2016 estimate, if global maize, rice and wheat exports declined by 10%, 55 million people in 58 poor countries lose at least 5% of their food supply. Further, two specific Rossby wave pattern are known to induce simultaneous heat extremes in either Eastern Asia, Eastern Europe and Central North America, or in Western Asia, Western Europe and Western Central North America, respectively. These heat extremes have already been shown to cause 3–4% declines in crop yield across the affected regions: yet, concerningly, climate models overestimate the effects of such historic events in North America and underestimate them elsewhere, simulating effectively no net yield loss.

=== Labour and economic effects ===
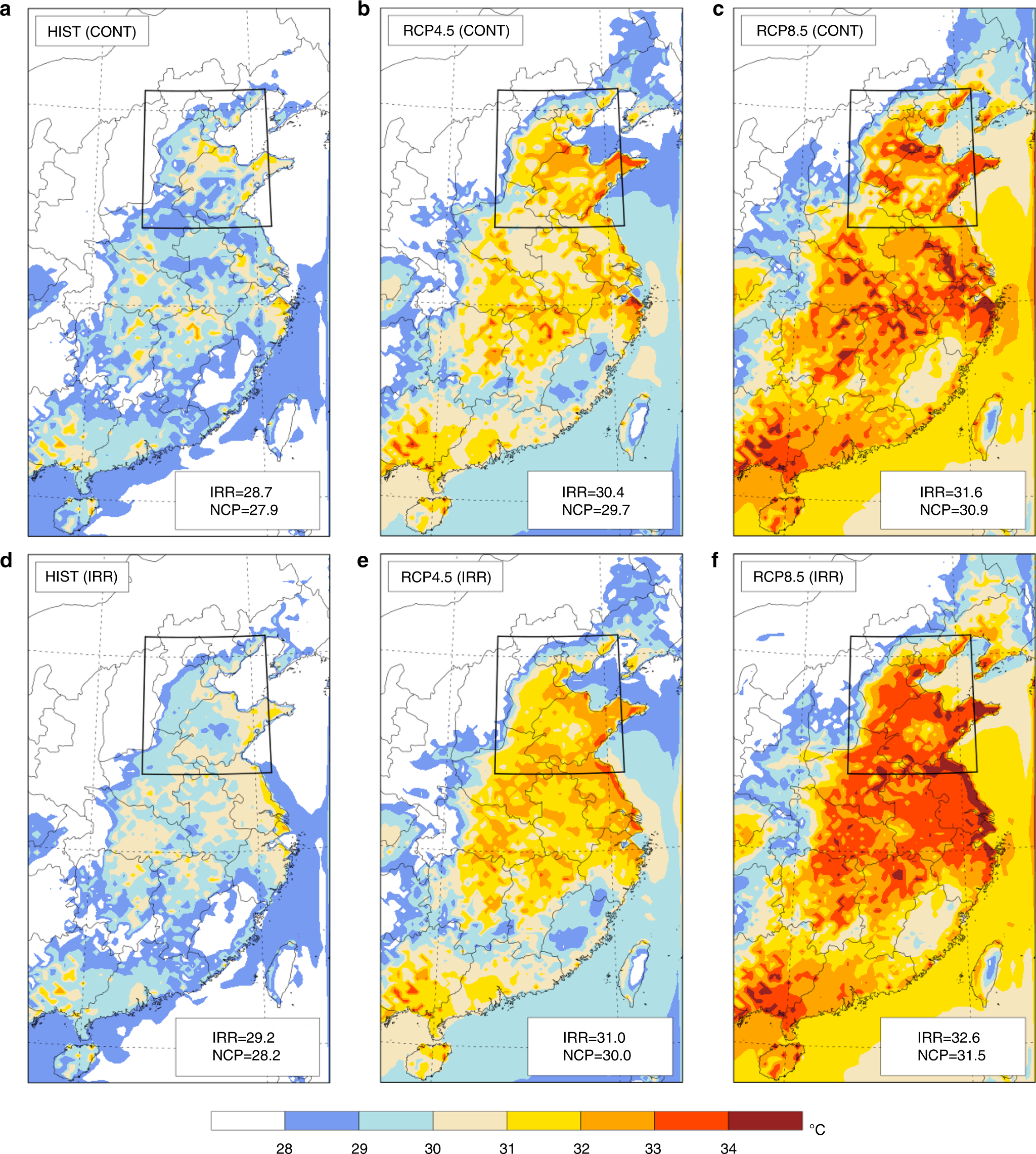
Climate change is expected to exacerbate heat stress over at the North China Plain, which is particularly vulnerable as widespread irrigation results in very moist air. There is a risk that agricultural labourers will be physically unable to work outdoors on hot summer days, particularly under the scenario of greatest emissions and warming.

As extreme weather events become more common and more intense, floods and droughts can destroy crops and eliminate food supply, while disrupting agricultural activities and rendering workers jobless. With more costs to the farmer, some will no longer find it financially feasible to farm: i.e. some farmers may choose to permanently leave drought-affected areas. Agriculture employs the majority of the population in most low-income countries and increased costs can result in worker layoffs or pay cuts. Other farmers will respond by raising their food prices; a cost that is directly passed on to the consumer and affects the affordability of food. Some farms do not sell their produce but instead feed a family or community; without that food, people will not have enough to eat. This results in decreased production, increased food prices, and potential starvation in parts of the world. The agriculture industry in India makes up 52% of their employment and the Canadian Prairies supply 51% of Canadian agriculture; any changes in the production of food crops from these areas could have profound effects on the economy.

Notably, one estimate suggests that a warming of 3 °C (5.4 °F) relative to late 20th century (i.e. closer to 4 °C (7.2 °F) when compared to preindustrial temperatures – a level associated with the SSP5-8.5 scenario) would cause labour capacity in Sub-Saharan Africa and Southeast Asia to decline by 30 to 50%, as the number of days when outdoor workers experience heat stress increases: up to 250 days the worst-affected parts of these two continents and of Central and South America. This could then increase crop prices by around 5%.

Similarly, North China Plain is also expected to be highly affected, in part due to the region's extensive irrigation networks resulting in unusually moist air. In scenarios without aggressive action to stop climate change, some heatwaves could become extreme enough to cause mass mortality in outdoor labourers, although they will remain relatively uncommon (up to around once per decade starting from 2100 under the most extreme scenario).

Further, the role of climate change in undernutrition and micronutrient deficiencies can be calculated as the loss of "years of full health".One estimate presented in 2016 suggests that under the scenario of strong warming and low adaptation due to high global conflict and rivalry, such losses may take up 0.4% of the global GDP and 4% of the GDP in India and the South Asian region by the year 2100.

=== Long-term predictions (beyond 2050) ===
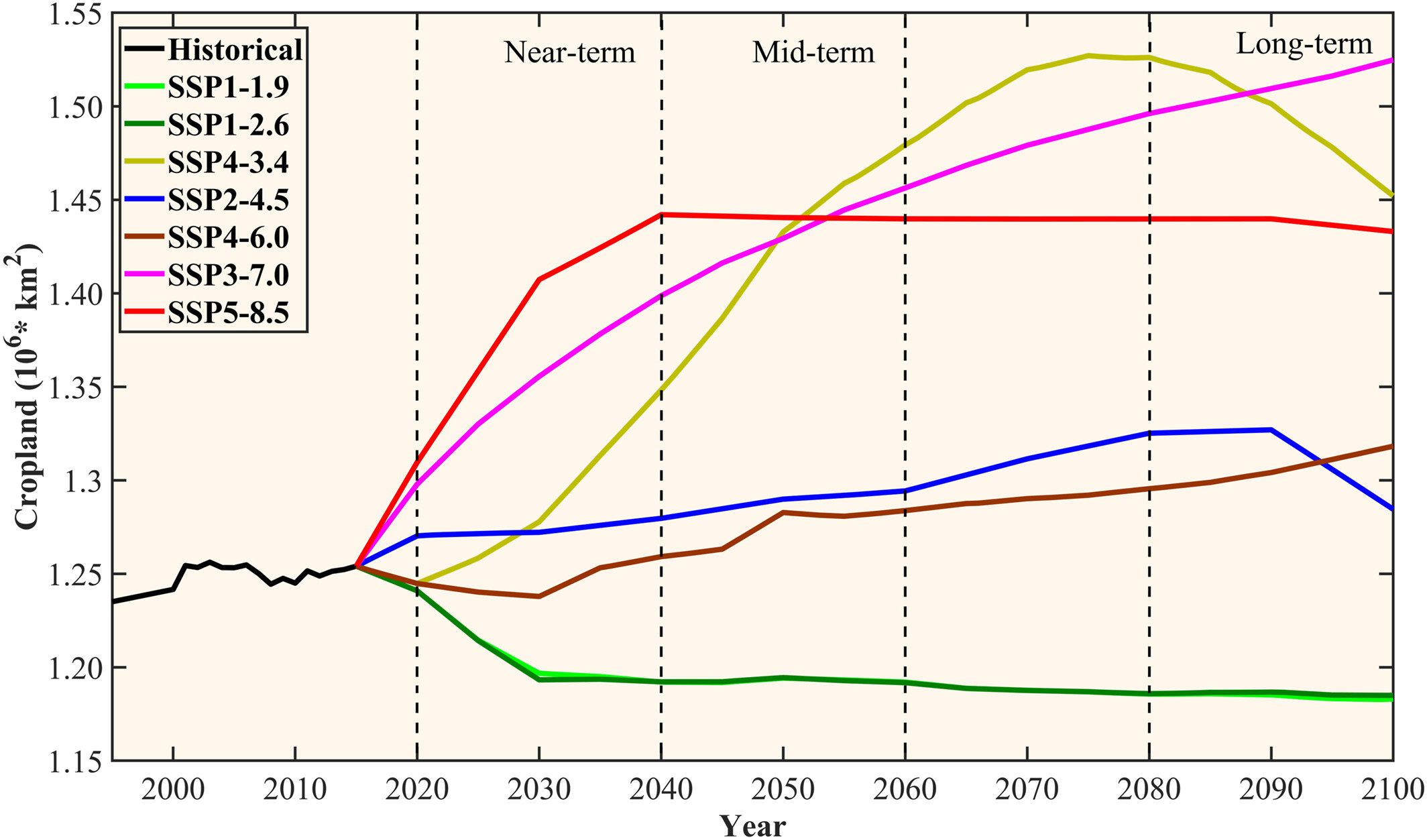
In South Asia, the extent of cropland is expected to increase under most climate and socioeconomic scenarios, with some of the largest increases seen under high-warming scenarios. Low-warming scenarios are expected to see a decrease in area due to lower demand. Similar trends are expected globally.

There are fewer projections looking beyond 2050. In general, even as climate change would cause increasingly severe effects on food production, most scientists do not anticipate it to result in mass human mortality within this century. This is in part because the studies also anticipate at least some continuation of the ongoing agricultural improvements, yet also because of agricultural expansion. For instance, a 2013 paper estimated that if the high warming of RCP 8.5 scenario was not alleviated by CO_{2} fertilization effect, it would reduce aggregate yields by 17% by the year 2050: yet, it anticipated that this would be mostly offset through an 11% increase in cropland area.

Similarly, one of the assumptions of Shared Socioeconomic Pathways is a significant increase in land allocated to agriculture (and a corresponding decrease in forest and "other natural land" area) in every pathway besides the SSP1 (officially subtitled "Sustainability" or "Taking the Green Road"), where the inverse occurs – and which has both the lowest level of future warming and the lowest projected population growth.

== Regional effects ==
=== Africa ===
Agriculture is a particularly important sector in Africa, contributing towards livelihoods and economies across the continent. Many people rely on the agriculture as a way to build themselves economically and a source of food. Many rely on climate sensitive resources. It is projected that crop activity will decrease across Sub-Saharan Africa. On average, agriculture in Sub-Saharan Africa contributes 15% of the total GDP. Africa's geography makes it particularly vulnerable to climate change, and 70% of the population rely on rain-fed agriculture for their livelihoods. Smallholder farms account for 80% of cultivated lands in Sub-Saharan Africa. The IPCC in 2007 projected that climate variability and change would severely compromise agricultural productivity and access to food. This projection was assigned "high confidence". Cropping systems, livestock and fisheries will be at greater risk of pest and diseases as a result of future climate change. Crop pests already account for approximately 1/6th of farm productivity losses. Climate change will accelerate the prevalence of pests and diseases and increase the occurrence of highly impactful events. The impacts of climate change on agricultural production in Africa will have serious implications for food security and livelihoods. The lack of diverse nutrition caused a failure to ingest certain essential nutrition. The lack of these nutrition can cause deficiency in vitamin A and iron. This was very common to see during the times of droughts and lack of foods because options were few. Between 2014 and 2018, Africa had the highest levels of food insecurity in the world.

In relation to agricultural systems, heavy reliance on rain-fed subsistence farming and low adoption of climate smart agricultural practices contribute to the sector's high levels of vulnerability. The situation is compounded by poor reliability of, and access to, climate data and information to support adaptation actions. Observed and projected disruptions in precipitation patterns due to climate change are likely to shorten growing seasons and affect crop yield in many parts of Africa. Furthermore, the agriculture sector in Africa is dominated by smallholder farmers with limited access to technology and the resources to adapt.

Climate variability and change have been and continue to be the principal source of fluctuations in global food production across developing countries where production is highly rain-dependent. The agriculture sector is sensitive to climate variability, especially the inter-annual variability of precipitation, temperature patterns, and extreme weather events (droughts and floods). These climatic events are predicted to increase in the future and are expected to have significant consequences to the agriculture sector. This would have a negative influence on food prices, food security, and land-use decisions. Yields from rainfed agriculture in some African countries could be reduced by up to 50% by 2020. To prevent the future destructive impact of climate variability on food production, it is crucial to adjust or suggest possible policies to cope with increased climate variability. African countries need to build a national legal framework to manage food resources in accordance with the anticipated climate variability. However, before devising a policy to cope with the impacts of climate variability, especially to the agriculture sector, it is critical to have a clear understanding of how climate variability affects different food crops. This is particularly relevant in 2020 due to the severe invasion of Locusts adversely affecting agriculture in eastern Africa. The invasion was partially attributed to climate change – the warmer temperature and heavier rainfall which caused an abnormal increase in the number of locusts.

=== Asia ===
For East and Southeast Asia, an estimate in 2007 stated that crop yields could increase up to 20% by the mid-21st century. In Central and South Asia, projections suggested that yields might decrease by up to 30%, over the same time period. Taken together, the risk of hunger was projected to remain very high in several developing countries.

Different Asian Countries have various effects from climate change. China, for example, benefits from a 1.5 °C (2.7 °F) temperature increase scenario accompanying with carbon fertilization and leading to a 3% gain of US$18 billion per year; however, India will face two thirds of the continent's aggregate losses on agriculture because its high corp net revenue suffers from the high spring temperature. In the Indo-Gangetic plain of India, heat stress and water availability are predicted to have significant negative effects on yield of wheat. Direct effects of increased mean and maximum temperatures is predicted to reduce wheat yields by up to 10%. The effect of reduced availability of water for irrigation is more significant, running at yield losses up to 35%.

Due to climate change, livestock production will be decreased in Bangladesh by diseases, scarcity of forage, heat stress and breeding strategies.

=== Australia and New Zealand ===
Without further adaptation to climate change, projected effects would likely be substantial. By 2030, production from agriculture and forestry was projected to decline over much of southern and eastern Australia, and over parts of eastern New Zealand. In New Zealand, initial benefits were projected close to major rivers and in western and southern areas.

=== Europe ===
For Southern Europe, it was predicted in 2007 that climate change would reduce crop productivity. In Central and Eastern Europe, forest productivity was expected to decline. In Northern Europe, the initial effect of climate change was projected to increase crop yields. The 2019 European Environment Agency report "Climate change adaptation in the agricultural sector in Europe" again confirmed this. According to this 2019 report, projections indicate that yields of non-irrigated crops like wheat, corn and sugar beet would decrease in southern Europe by up to 50% by 2050 (under a high-end emission scenario). This could result in a substantial decrease in farm income by that date. Also farmland values are projected to decrease in parts of southern Europe by more than 80% by 2100, which could result in land abandonment. The trade patterns are also said to be affected, in turn affecting agricultural income. Also, increased food demand worldwide could exert pressure on food prices in the coming decades. In Ukraine, where temperatures are increasing throughout the year and precipitation is predicted to increase, winter wheat yields (wheat sown in winter) could increase by 20–40% in the north and northwestern regions by 2050, as compared to 2010.

=== Latin America ===
The major agricultural products of Latin America include livestock and grains; such as maize, wheat, soybeans, and rice. Increased temperatures and altered hydrological cycles are predicted to translate to shorter growing seasons, overall reduced biomass production, and lower grain yields. Brazil, Mexico and Argentina alone contribute 70-90% of the total agricultural production in Latin America. In these and other dry regions, maize production is expected to decrease. A study summarising a number of impact studies of climate change on agriculture in Latin America indicated that wheat is expected to decrease in Brazil, Argentina and Uruguay. Livestock, which is the main agricultural product for parts of Argentina, Uruguay, southern Brazil, Venezuela, and Colombia is likely to be reduced. Variability in the degree of production decrease among different regions of Latin America is likely. For example, one 2003 study that estimated future maize production in Latin America predicted that by 2055 maize in eastern Brazil will have moderate changes while Venezuela is expected to have drastic decreases.

Increased rainfall variability has been one of the most devastating consequences of climate change in Central America and Mexico. From 2009 to 2019, the region saw years of heavy rainfall in between years of below average rainfall. The spring rains of May and June have been particularly erratic, posing issues for farmers plant their maize crops at the onset of the spring rains. Most subsistence farmers in the region have no irrigation and thus depend on the rains for their crops to grow. In Mexico, only 21% of farms are irrigated, leaving the remaining 79% dependent on rainfall.

Suggested potential adaptation strategies to mitigate the effects of global warming on agriculture in Latin America include using plant breeding technologies and installing irrigation infrastructure.

=== North America ===
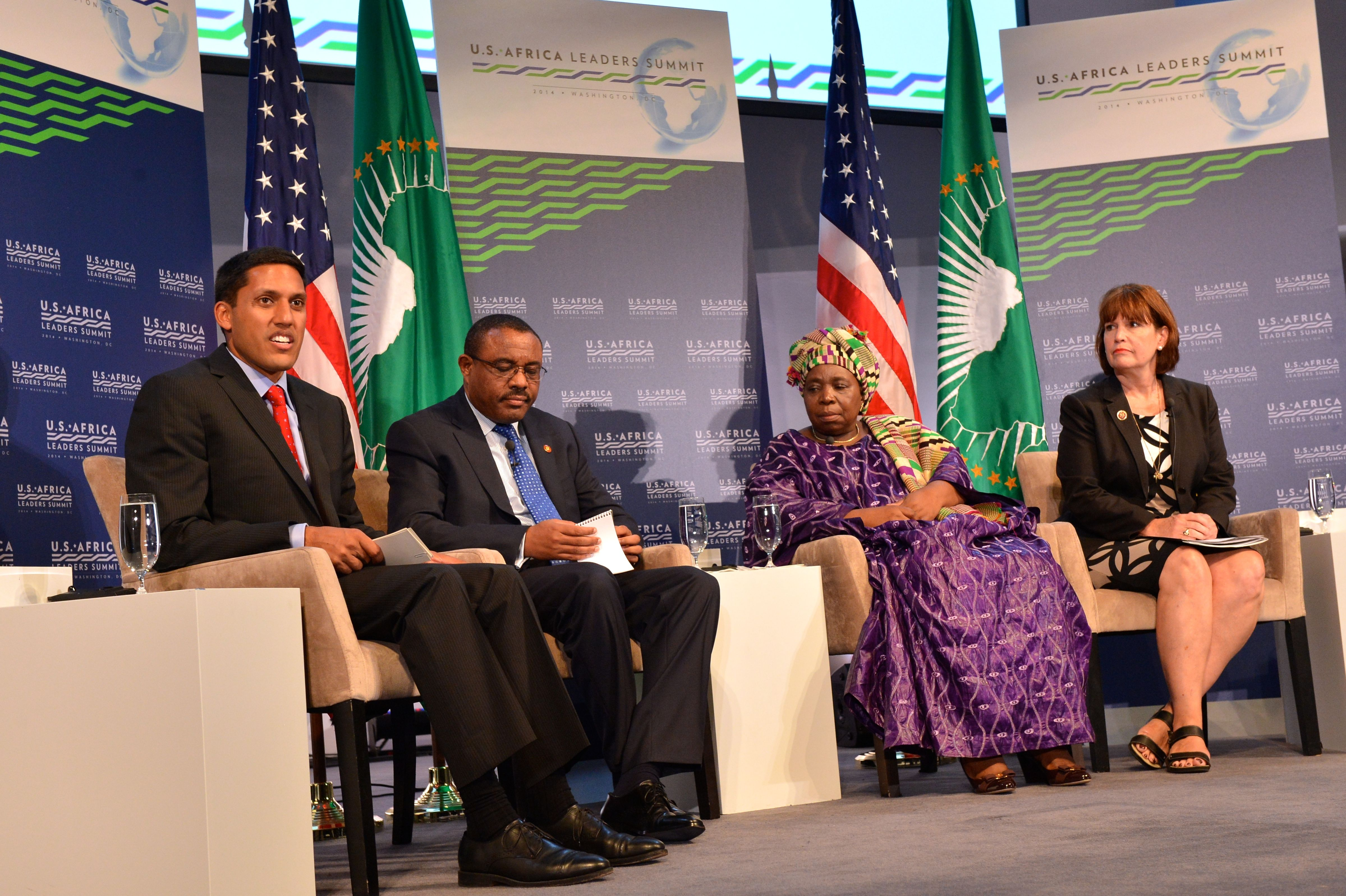
U.S. and African leaders meet at a Leaders Summit for Food Security and Climate change at the National Academy of Sciences in Washington, D.C. in 2014.

Droughts are becoming more frequent and intense in arid and semiarid western North America as temperatures have been rising, advancing the timing and magnitude of spring snow melt floods and reducing river flow volume in summer. Direct effects of climate change include increased heat and water stress, altered crop phenology, and disrupted symbiotic interactions. These effects may be exacerbated by climate changes in river flow, and the combined effects are likely to reduce the abundance of native trees in favour of non-native herbaceous and drought-tolerant competitors, reduce the habitat quality for many native animals, and slow litter decomposition and nutrient cycling. Climate change effects on human water demand and irrigation may intensify these effects.

In Canada, notable increases are predicted for spring-sown wheat.

== Adaptation ==
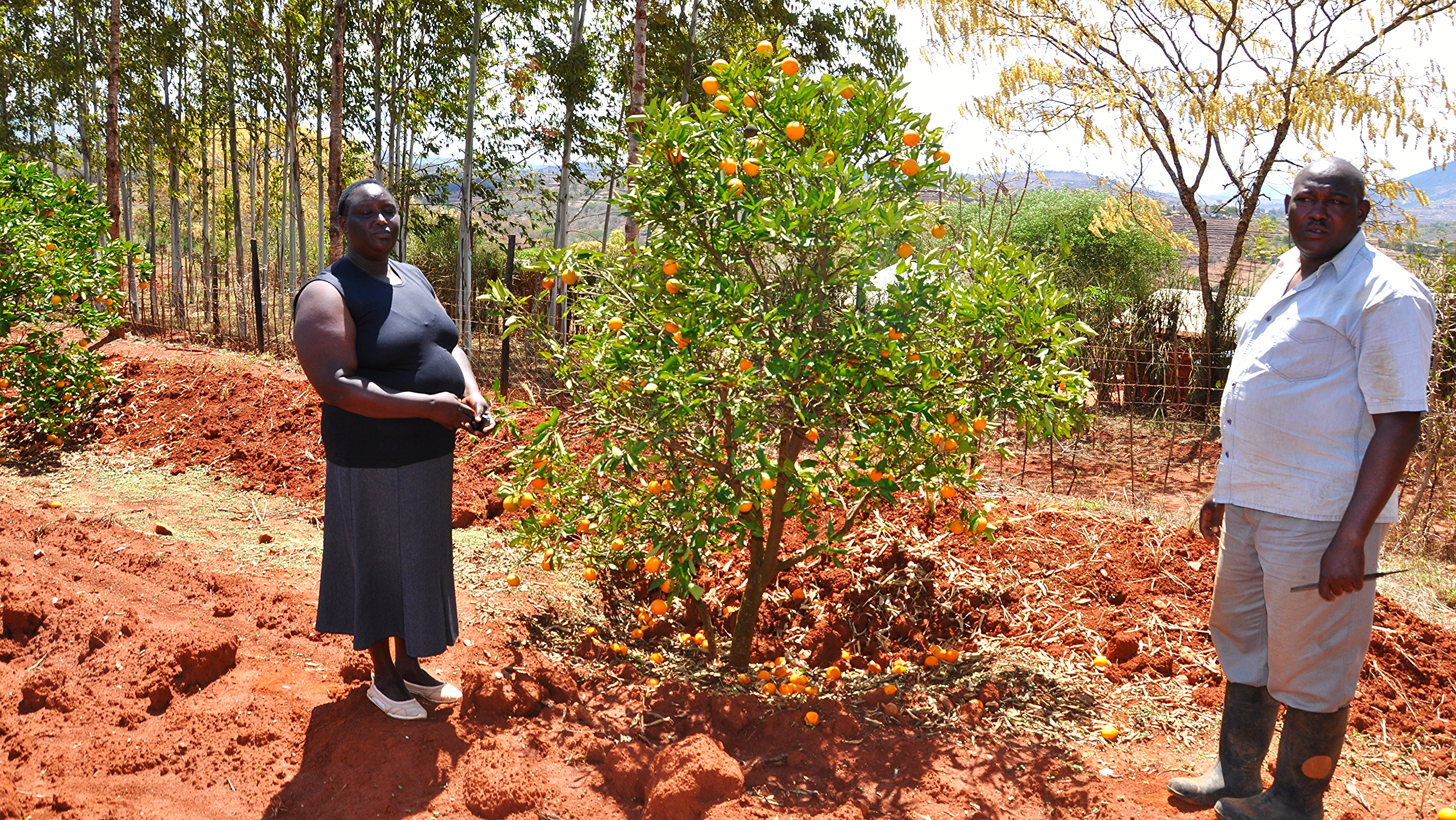
Climate smart agriculture in Machakos County, Kenya

Climate change adaptation measures may reduce the risk of negative effects on agriculture from climate change. Adaptation can occur through changes in management practices, agricultural innovation, institutional changes, and climate-smart agriculture. To create a sustainable food system, these measures are considered as essential as changes needed to reduce global warming in general.

Agricultural innovation is essential to addressing the potential issues of climate change. This includes better management of soil, water-saving technology, matching crops to environments, introducing different crop varieties, crop rotations, appropriate fertilization use, and supporting community-based adaptation strategies. On a government and global level, research and investments into agricultural productivity and infrastructure must be done to get a better picture of the issues involved and the best methods to address them. Government policies and programs must provide environmentally sensitive government subsidies, educational campaigns, and economic incentives as well as funds, insurance, and safety nets for vulnerable populations. In addition, providing early warning systems, and accurate weather forecasts to poor or remote areas will allow for better preparation.

Climate change is altering global rainfall patterns. This affects agriculture. Rainfed agriculture accounts for 80% of global agriculture. Many of the 852 million poor people in the world live in parts of Asia and Africa that depend on rainfall to cultivate food crops. Climate change will modify rainfall, evaporation, runoff, and soil moisture storage. Extended drought can cause the failure of small and marginal farms. This results in increased economic, political, and social disruption.

Water availability, including changes in total seasonal precipitation or its pattern of variability, influences agriculture. Moisture stress during flowering, pollination, and grain-filling harms most crops. It is particularly harmful to corn, soybeans, and wheat. Increased evaporation from the soil and accelerated transpiration in the plants themselves will cause moisture stress.

There are many adaptation options. One is to develop crop varieties with greater drought tolerance and another is to build local rainwater storage. Using small planting basins to harvest water in Zimbabwe has boosted maize yields. This happens whether rainfall is abundant or scarce. In Niger, they have led to three or fourfold increases in millet yields. Additionally, a 2023 study in southwestern Ethiopia showed that giving farmers access to agricultural extension services and climate information significantly increases their adoption of adaptation strategies, such as crop diversification and the use of drought resistant crops.

Digital technologies allow farmers to adapt to changing rainfall patterns through remote sensing of soil moisture, IoT-based irrigation control, and data analytics for rainfall forecasting.

Climate change can threaten food security and water security. It is possible to adapt food systems to improve food security and prevent negative impacts from climate change in the future.

== Greenhouse gas emissions from agriculture ==
Greenhouse gas emissions from agriculture are large: the agriculture, forestry and land use sectors contribute between 13% and 21% of global greenhouse gas emissions. Direct greenhouse gas emissions include those from rice and livestock farming. Indirect emissions from the conversion of non-agricultural land such as forests into agricultural land are also very important. With regard to direct emissions, nitrous oxide and methane make up over half of total greenhouse gas emissions from agriculture. A 2023 review emphasizes that emissions from agricultural soils are shaped by factors such as soil type, climate, and management practices. It also highlights several mitigation strategies, including conservation tillage, precision agriculture, improved water use, and the application of biochar, that can reduce emissions and enhance soil carbon storage.

== See also ==
- 2022 food crises – Increase in food prices and shortages around the world
- Agroecology – Study of ecological processes in agriculture
- Climate change and invasive species – Increase of invasive organisms caused by climate change
- Climate change and meat production – Impact of farming animals on the environment
- Climate resilience – Form of adaptive capacity for a socio-ecological system
- Climate-smart agriculture – System for agricultural productivity
- Effects of climate change
- Effects of climate change on fisheries
- Environmental issues with agriculture
- Multiple breadbasket failure – Simultaneous disruption of key food-growing regions
- Special Report on Climate Change and Land – IPCC report
