= Climate change adaptation strategies on the German coast =

Climate change adaptation strategies

Climate change adaptation strategies on the German coast include European, national, and regional politics, different economic and civilian sectors as well as coastal protection. In general, climate change refers to statistically identifiable changes in climate properties that persist over a longer period of time. The United Nations Framework Convention on Climate Change (UNFCCC) defines it as a change in climate caused by human activity that can be observed in addition to natural climate variability. This can be described as anthropogenic climate change. Climate change poses local level impacts on the German coast and for the present and future, suitable adaptation strategies are necessary. In 2008, the Federal Cabinet of Germany decided on a German Climate Change Adaptation Strategy with the objective of creating a national action framework for reducing the risks for the population, habitats as well as the economy.

Map German Coast

Adaptation is a contested, widely discussed term with no general definition. For the German Adaptation Strategy the definition of the Intergovernmental Panel on Climate Change (IPCC) is utilized, stating that adaptation is the adjustment of natural or human systems to occurring or expected changes in climate in order to reduce harm. This approach views climate change as the major source of vulnerability and does not consider any social causes. The German Coast comprises 1600 km to the west at the North Sea and 2100 km to the east at the Baltic Sea. In total, five states border the German coast. Lower Saxony, Bremen and Hamburg are part of the North Sea region; Mecklenburg-Vorpommern border the Baltic Sea and Schleswig-Holstein is located at both seas. Coast can be defined as the zone where the land is considerably influenced by the sea and vice versa.

== History of climate change adaptation at the German coast ==
The coastal inhabitants in Germany have always been exposed to the forces of nature, especially to storm floods and had to adapt to changing conditions. It is assumed that in Schleswig-Holstein in the 11th century, people started to build dykes to protect living and usable spaces from sea level rise and storm floods. Adaptation especially to the Anthropogenic Climate Change started in the 21st century, although initially the focus has been on climate protection. The German Government took up climate change adaptation for the first time in 2005 in the frame of its climate protection programme.

== Climate change impacts on the German coast ==
Certain and reliable predictions for impacts of anthropogenic climate change on the German coast regarding temperature, precipitation, sea level and storm flood heights do not exist. Different models show different results and it is assumed that all changes in the range of the results have the same likelihood to occur. For the end of the 21st century, the temperature is expected to rise between +0.6 °C and +6.2 °C in comparison to 1961–1990. For the same period of time, a change of precipitation between -47% and +73% is likely.

Sea level and storm floods are complex phenomena and are influenced by diverse factors, such as astronomical (tides), meteorological (wind), and tectonic (isostatic movements) variables which makes it even more difficult to predict how they will change with climate change. At the Baltic Sea, sea level is expected to rise in line with the expected global average rise in sea level. According to the Intergovernmental Penal on Climate Change (IPCC) 5th Assessment Report, global average sea level is predicted to rise 0.26-0.55 m in the period 2081–2100 in relation to 1986-2005 sea level. Studies show that at the German North Sea coast, sea level from 1843-2008 has risen between 1,6 and 1,8 mm per year. Higher values have been observed at the west coast of Schleswig-Holstein and lower values at the Lower Saxon coast. In future, sea level rise at the North Sea is expected to be higher than the global average as a result of post-glacial land depression. There is now statistical evidence existing on how the storm flood height will change in future at the Baltic Sea. At both seas, a rise in storm flood height is expected due to climate change related sea level rise.

== Politics of climate change adaptation ==
European, national as well as regional politics play a role in climate change adaptation at the German North Sea coast and Baltic Sea coast. In 2009, the European Union presented the White Paper Adapting to Climate Change: Towards a European framework for action which was a first approach to joint climate change adaptation politics. In 2013, the European Union established the EU Strategy on Adaptation to Climate Change. National and local climate change adaptation programs for the German coast are often considered as part of the EU Strategy on Adaptation to Climate Change. In a local setting, urban planning is an important part of adaptation politics.

=== European climate change adaptation politics for the North Sea and Baltic Sea ===
The German North Sea is part of the North Sea Region (NSR) Program 2014 - 2020 of the European Climate Adaptation Platform (Climate-ADAPT). This regional European development fund includes coastal zones of the United Kingdom, Belgium, the Netherlands, Germany, Denmark, Sweden and Norway. NSR developed a cooperation program, which was adopted by the European Commission in August 2015. The cooperation program focuses on adaptation to climate change impacts and on preserving the environment, stimulating a green economy, promoting green transportation and mobility as well as supporting growth in the North Sea Region. Another actor in climate change adaptation in the German North Sea Region is the Wadden Sea Secretariat, a cooperation between Denmark, The Netherlands, and Germany that has been established in 1978 to protect the Wadden Sea as an ecological entity. The Wadden Sea Secretariat addresses and communicates the impacts of climate change on the Wadden Sea. In 1998, the working group Coastal Protection and Sea Level Rise (CPSL) was founded, dealing with the impacts of climate change. Until 2010, the CPSL has published three reports, which provided information for governmental conferences.

The Baltic Sea Region Program was developed by the EU Climate Adaptation Platform (Climate-ADAPT) to strengthen development and cooperation between the abutting nations of the Baltic Sea. In 2013, the predecessor EU Project BALTADAPT (Baltic Sea Region Climate Change Adaptation Strategy) published an action plan for climate change adaptation in the Baltic Sea regions. It focused on strategies for building and sharing knowledge of climate change adaptation, mainstreaming it and on connecting the strategies of the nations in the Baltic Sea Region to adapt to climate change.

=== German climate change adaptation politics for the North Sea and the Baltic Sea ===
The political framework for climate change adaptation in Germany is given by the German Strategy for Adaptation to Climate Change (2008). Regarding climate change at the North Sea and the Baltic Sea, the strategy states that the expected magnitude of damage due to climate change is unclear. In 2011, the German government presented an action plan for climate change adaptation which includes resolutions from the Wadden Sea Secretariat for the North Sea Region. In behalf of the Federal Environmental Agency (UBA), the project KüstenKlima (2014) by the Institut Raum & Energie (...) published a strategy for climate protection and climate change adaptation at the German coast mainly due to coastal management. In the report, it was highlighted that an integrated coastal zone management (IKZM) is an important method for adaptation. IKZM is an informal management approach to strengthen sustainable development by means of integration, communication, good coordination practice, and participation. The Federal Ministry of Education and Research (BMBF) facilitates the project KLIMZUG - Klimawandel in Regionen zukunftsfähig gestalten (2008-2014) which includes adaptation strategies in seven model regions in Germany. The "KLIMZUG" program aimed to integrate climate change adaptation processes into regional development. Three of this model regions are located at the German coast. The program "KLIMZUG-NORD" focuses on the metropolitan region Hamburg, the program "RADOST" on adaptation strategies for the German Baltic Sea coast and "nordwest2050" is a research project for climate change adaptation and innovation processes for the metropolitan region of Bremen and Oldenburg.

At the level of Länder there are also individual climate change adaptation programs.

==== Mecklenburg-Vorpommern ====
The state government of Mecklenburg-Vorpommern presented a first climate protection program in the year 1997 (Aktionsplan Klimaschutz Mecklenburg-Vorpommern).

The Baltic Sea region of Mecklenburg Vorpommern is part of the EU BALTADAPT program.

==== Schleswig-Holstein ====
Based on the German adaptation strategy to climate change, the state government of Schleswig-Holstein for the first time presented a strategy for climate change adaptation (Fahrplan Anpassung an den Klimawandel) in 2011. The program was updated in 2017. The proximity to North Sea and Baltic Sea strongly influenced the program which can be recognized in the highlighted topics water economy and protection of the sea and soil.

==== Bremen ====
Besides actions in coastal protection, there is the project KLAS - Klimaanpassungsstrategie an extreme Regenereignisse in der Stadtgemeinde Bremen promoted by the Federal Ministry for the Environment, Nature Conservation and Nuclear Safety (BMU). The program aims to develop a better risk management for strong rain events.

==== Hamburg ====
Hamburg is a model region for the national project KLIMZUG-NORD. A strategy for climate change adaptation was developed in 2011. In 2013, an action plan for climate change adaptation was published.

==== Lower-Saxony ====
The state government of Lower-Saxony established a government commission for climate protection and adaptation in 2008 to develop a strategy for climate change adaptation and protection. In 2013, the state government enacted the Klimapolitische Umsetzungsstrategie Niedersachen. This program includes coastal protection strategies.

== Adaptation strategies in coastal protection ==
According to DIN 4047–2, coastal protection comprises measures defending the shoreline against destructive interactions with the sea. That includes the protection of the coastal lowlands against flooding to allow the use of these areas as well as the protection of the coastline against shoreline recession and coastal erosion.

When it comes to climate change adaptation, coastal protection in Germany divides into three categories of measures:

1. Defence of the existing coastline
  - "hard" solutions (e.g. heightening and fortification of levees)
  - "soft" solutions (e.g. establishment of shallow water areas for retention of floods)
2. Adaptation to extreme weather events, e.g. by building on dwelling mounds or other forms of constructional preventions
3. Moving away from coastal areas to less affected regions, not using or extensively using the coastal regions

=== Coastal protection policy ===
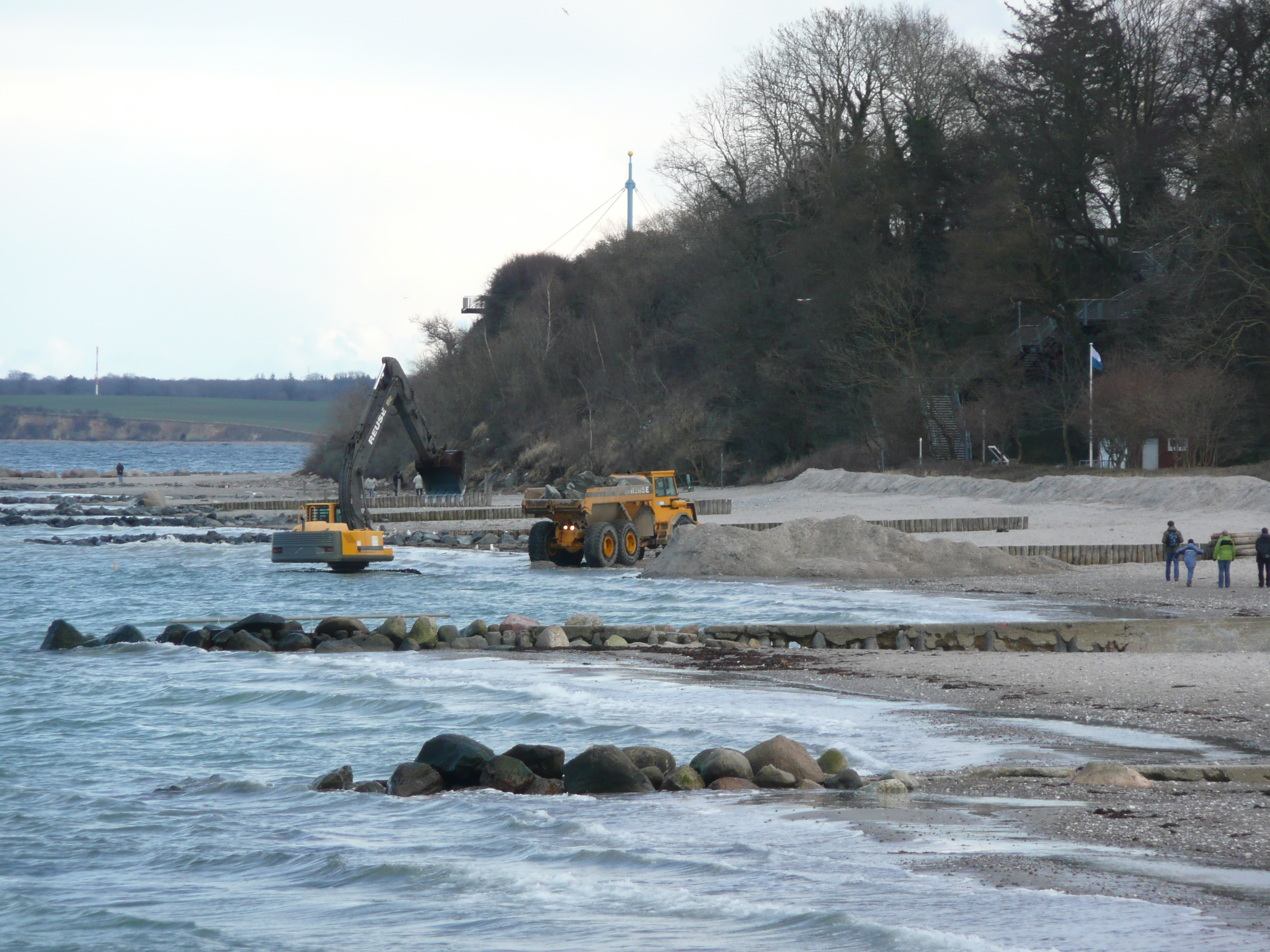
Groynes in Howacht (Schleswig-Holstein) at the Baltic Sea coast

Coastal protection in Germany is organised and structured by legal regulations. Climate change adaptation in Germany has to be integrated in coastal protection plans on all spatial levels in order to achieve effective adaptation of the coastal protection sector. German administration distinguishes between active and passive coastal protection. Active coastal protection refers to measures that support floodplain reclamation and approaches to relocate acting forces (current, breaking wave) seawards (e.g. by beach nourishment) whereas passive coastal protection solidifies the shoreline (so-called hold the line approaches) and supports the absorption of incoming forces to avoid harmful consequences. Passive coastal protection can include seawalls, groynes, detached breakwaters, and revetments. Important actors in coastal risk management are political authorities, inhabitants of the respective region (households) as well as investors.

Traditionally, coastal protection in Germany is focussed on technical protection measures (i.a. levees, artificial flood barriers). This approach has already been followed in the Generalplan Deichverstärkung, Deichverkürzung und Küstenschutz des Landes Schleswig-Holstein of 1963, a specific coastal protection plan for Schleswig-Holstein. Today (2017-2020), technical measures are still most probable to be funded by the state. According to the German Federal agency for the environment (UBA), coastal protection currently focusses on the fortification and heightening of levees and other protective structures, including retaining structures. It is a matter of discussion if and how these types of linear "hard" protection measures can in the face of climate change be extended to planar "soft" protection measures (e.g. (re-)instalment of shallow water areas to simultaneously reach nature conservation and climate protection goals).

Facing future climate risks, coastal protection increasingly integrates landscape-based prevention measures. The German government aims to enhance synergies between "hard" and "soft" coastal protection measures by means of the Integriertes Küstenzonenmanagement approach (Integrated Coastal Zone Management, IKZM). Its former general principle of "defending at all cost" is currently converting towards "living with water" and is putting stronger emphasis on changing climatic conditions. This means for example that in spaces where neither individuals nor material values are at risk, it is an option to partially open up dykes and thereby enable self-acting adaptation. Connected to that is the expressed ambition to coordinate adaptation measures, to fit coastal areas in an overall spatial context and to involve a wide range of relevant actors (e.g. authorities, interest groups, science). Essential weight is put on harmonising economic and social beneficiary claims with protection interests in the coastal zone by elaborating on development trajectories, conflict potentials and solutions at an early stage of planning. Another aspect of coordinated adaptation in coastal protection refers to connections between urban and rural areas. Coastal protection in rural areas in northern Germany should be seen in connection with protection measures in big cities such as Hamburg or Bremen where discussed "soft" measures are less easily to implement. In the cities, linear protection measures like levees and flood walls will probably be further enhanced/fostered but it would be interesting for cities to participate in solutions of laminar coastal protection.

=== Adaptation in practical coastal protection ===
In order to find and establish adequate measures to adapt coastal protection to climate change, responsible actors in coastal protection need to have sound and detailed local and hydromorphological knowledge. Even with that, it is very difficult to predict direct and indirect consequences of climate change on the German coast. Challenging for planning authorities is a lack of clear information on future sea level dynamics. As there are no exact prognoses for sea level rise at the German coasts, planners of coastal protection measures as well as the inhabitants of the region are facing considerable uncertainties. Related to sea level rise, coastal protection has to react to higher base levels in the event of a storm flood. High storm flood levels are expected to be faster reached and longer lasting and storm floods that once only occurred every 350 years are predicted to happen once every 100 years by the middle of the 21st century. Especially in winter, stronger storms and higher levels of storm floods are expected as much as changes in sea conditions that cause major cases of coastal erosion and can pose more strain on levees by increased wave runup. Existing levees have usually been constructed to protect the hinterland against floods that statistically occur once every 350 years. As a result of the expected sea level rise, storm floods become more likely and the levees have to be adapted to that in their construction.

The protection level of these so-called "hard" technical coastal protection measures is currently determined on the basis of records from historic flooding events, and extrapolation (updating) of the previous sea level trends. Experts demand to better include a risk-oriented design of coastal protection measures and land use planning at the German coast and to integrate climate change scenarios (e.g. by respecting long-term climate change scenarios and the suspected rising sea level).

=== Finance ===
Innovative coastal protection measures require consistent economic incentives. In Germany, these can be compensations in the case of income losses resulting from coastal protection measures or buying land for setting back levees. Further, (re-)established water areas can be interesting for tourism or aquaculture.

The German Federal government can fund up to 70% of the investment costs that the Länder spend for coastal protection measures. Within the Sonderrahmenplan: Maßnahmen des Küstenschutzes in Folge des Klimawandels (2009-2025) (special framework for climate change related coastal protection measures), 25 million euros are provided by the state and the Länder. Other funding can be applied from the European development funds EAFRD and ERDF. It is expected that the total costs for coastal protection will considerably rise within the next year to reach 800 to 1000 billion euros.

== Adaptation strategies of the economy ==
Climate change influences the economy in German coastal regions which makes an adaptation in time necessary. This affects different economic sectors like the tourism industry, agriculture, the fishing industry or shipping.

=== Tourism industry ===
==== Impacts of climate change ====
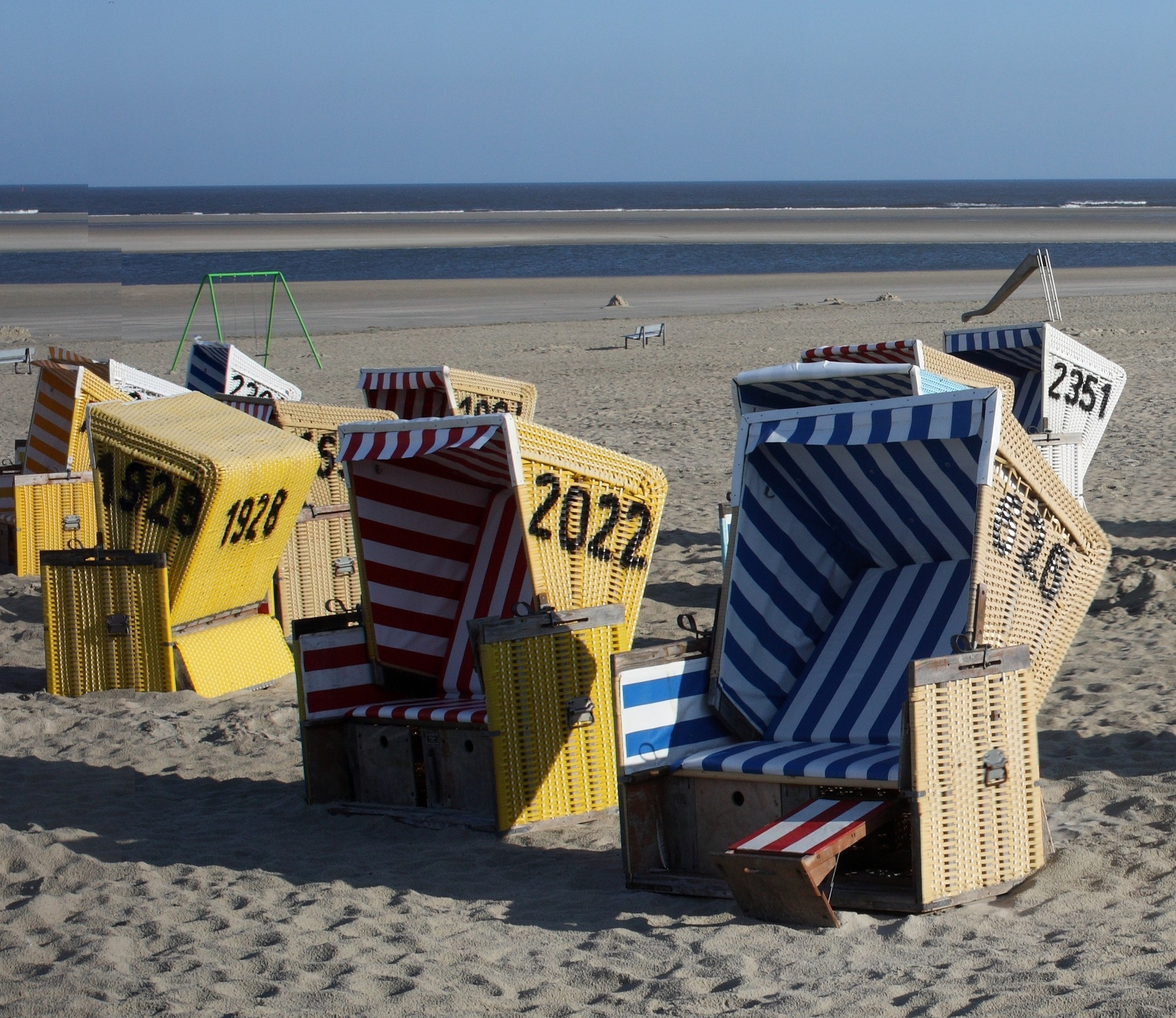
Beach chairs on Langeoog

Climate change implies risks and opportunities for the regional tourism of the German coast.

Higher temperatures and less precipitation in summer can enhance the attractiveness of coastal tourist destinations in Germany and extend the bathing season. The bathing season could be up to 60 days longer in 2100 which can entail around 25-30 percent more tourists. Higher numbers of visitors can open opportunities for the tourism industry, but can also lead to an overload for the local infrastructure. It increases the utilization pressure on ecosystems which is problematic as some places at the Baltic Sea have reached their capacity limit already.

Negative consequences are expected due to sea level rise and bigger waves which cause beach erosion and contribute to an inland shifting of the coastline. This can adversely affect the beach tourism. Water sports and other tourism activities can be limited due to heavy swell. Heavy rainfalls and floods can damage tourism institutions.

An increasing growth of algaes, seaweed and bacteria can deteriorate the water quality. This can be dangerous for the health of tourists and therefore reduce the attractiveness of the affected places. More jellyfishes can reduce the attractiveness of seaside resorts.

==== Adaptation strategies ====
The climate change adaptation strategies of the German coast are usually only indirectly linked to tourism as they are mainly coastal protection strategies, but also beneficial for the tourism industry. The adaptation possibilities depend on the individual characteristics of the specific holiday destinations. A difficulty is that climate change is not the only influencing factor on the tourism industry. Other external factors like different travel behavior or demographic changes have to be considered as well. In general, so called "no-regret-measures" are useful, which are strategies that are also beneficial without the effects of climate change as they contribute to a sustainable development of a certain region.

Most important is the preservation of the touristic potential of the regions which means the protection of nature. Second, visitors increasingly demand a climate-conscious behavior of the tourist providers. Every measure should be accompanied with information material for guests and local inhabitants. Some strategies want to strengthen offers that are independent from climate change like indoor halls or wellness.

The current focus of climate change adaptation in the tourism industry is on sharing of information with all decision makers, network building and the development of strategic planning concepts. The adaptation willingness so far is rather low because of the complexity, uncertainty and the potential chances like a longer bathing season.

=== Fishing industry ===
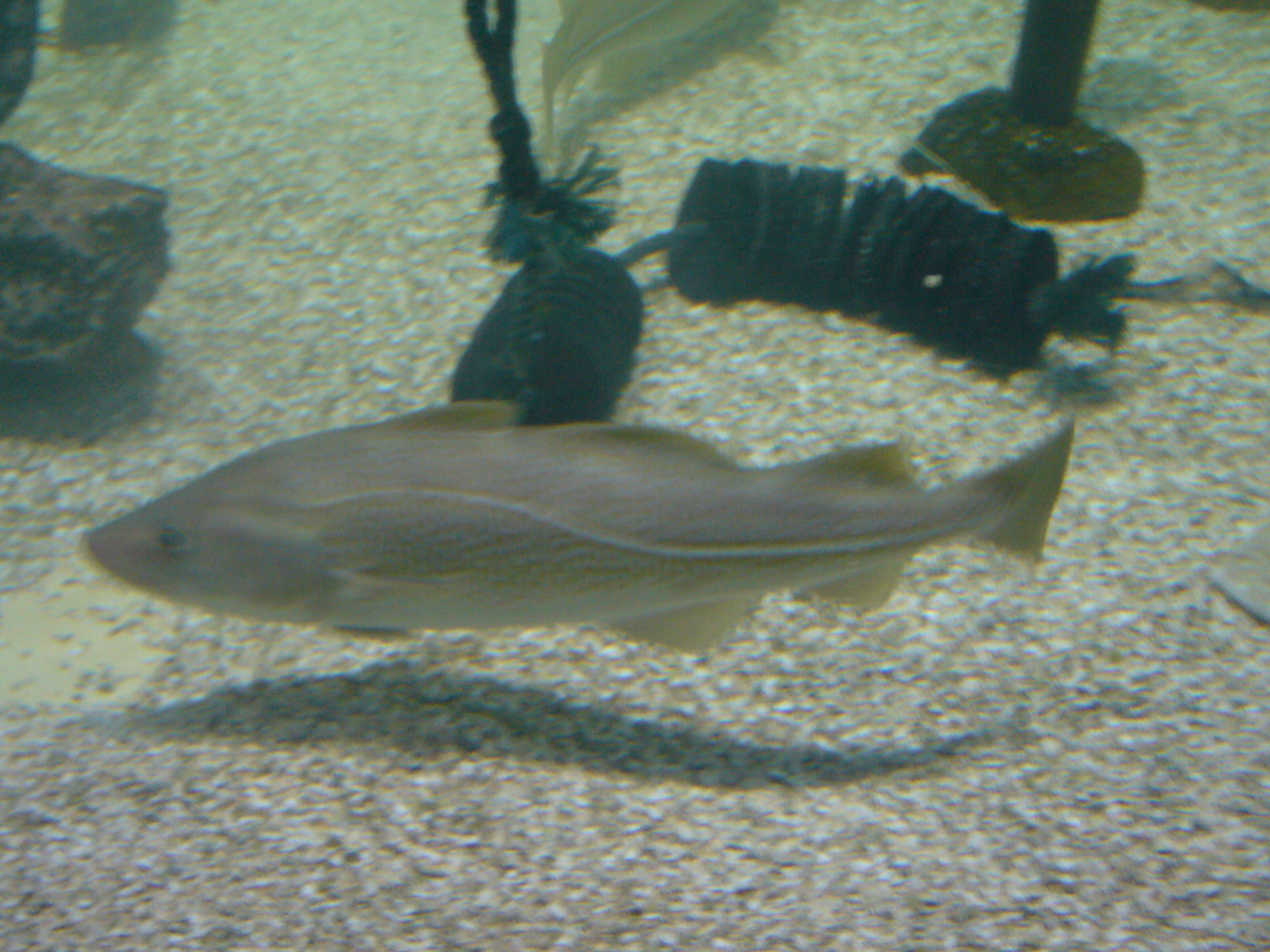
Codfish

==== Impacts of climate change ====
As a consequence of climate change, the North Sea and Baltic Sea will warm up. The CO_{2} content of the water will increase which makes it more acid. Together with extreme weather events and sea level rise, it will threaten long exiting habitats. Fish stocks and the population of marine organisms as well as marine food webs and rivalry situations are changing.

In the North Sea, the warmer water leads to a shift of the habitats of cold-loving fish stocks like cod and plaice to lower water temperatures in the North. The population of other marine animals will decline due to warmer winters. Favored by the warming of the sea, new species that have lived in more southern areas before like anchovies or the Pacific oyster will appear in the North Sea. The Baltic Sea as a brackish water is characterized by a highly sensitive ecosystem. Small changes in temperature, salinity and oxygen content lead to a significant shift in the compound of species. Climate change can shift the walking and spawning seasons of fishes and the vulnerability to infections and parasites is increasing.

The shift of habitats of fish populations to the North combines with big financial losses for the local fishing industry which is an important economic sector for some structurally weak coastal areas. It especially affects very small, financially weak fishing companies. If these losses can be compensated by new species is not known yet. Coastal production facilities are in danger of being flooded or damaged by sea level rise and storm floods. Higher swell and extreme weather events can deteriorate the fishing conditions.

It's hard to differentiate between the consequences of climate change and other influencing stress factors like overfishing, shipping or pollutants in the water.

==== Adaptation strategies ====
There are different technical possibilities to make the fishing industry more sustainable. Improved fishing techniques and mesh sizes for nets contribute to reduce by-catches. A real-time monitoring of the catches could support the establishment of sanctuaries by justifying seasonal and territorial restrictions for the fishery. It makes an adaptation of the catch amount and fished species possible. Protection zones would help to recover the full reproductivity of fish stocks. It is important to explain the consumers which fish species can be bought and which not. New sources of income for fishermen, for example in the tourism industry, could be another strategy.

=== Shipping industry ===
The potential climate change impacts at the German coast will pose risks and chances for the shipping industry to which especially harbours will have to adapt to. The economic efficiency of waterways, shipping routes and construction measures depend on water conditions, current as well as sediment transport. The three KLIMZUG projects "RADOST", "nordwest2050" and "KLIMZUG-NORD" include research and adaptation strategies for harbours and the shipping industry in general.

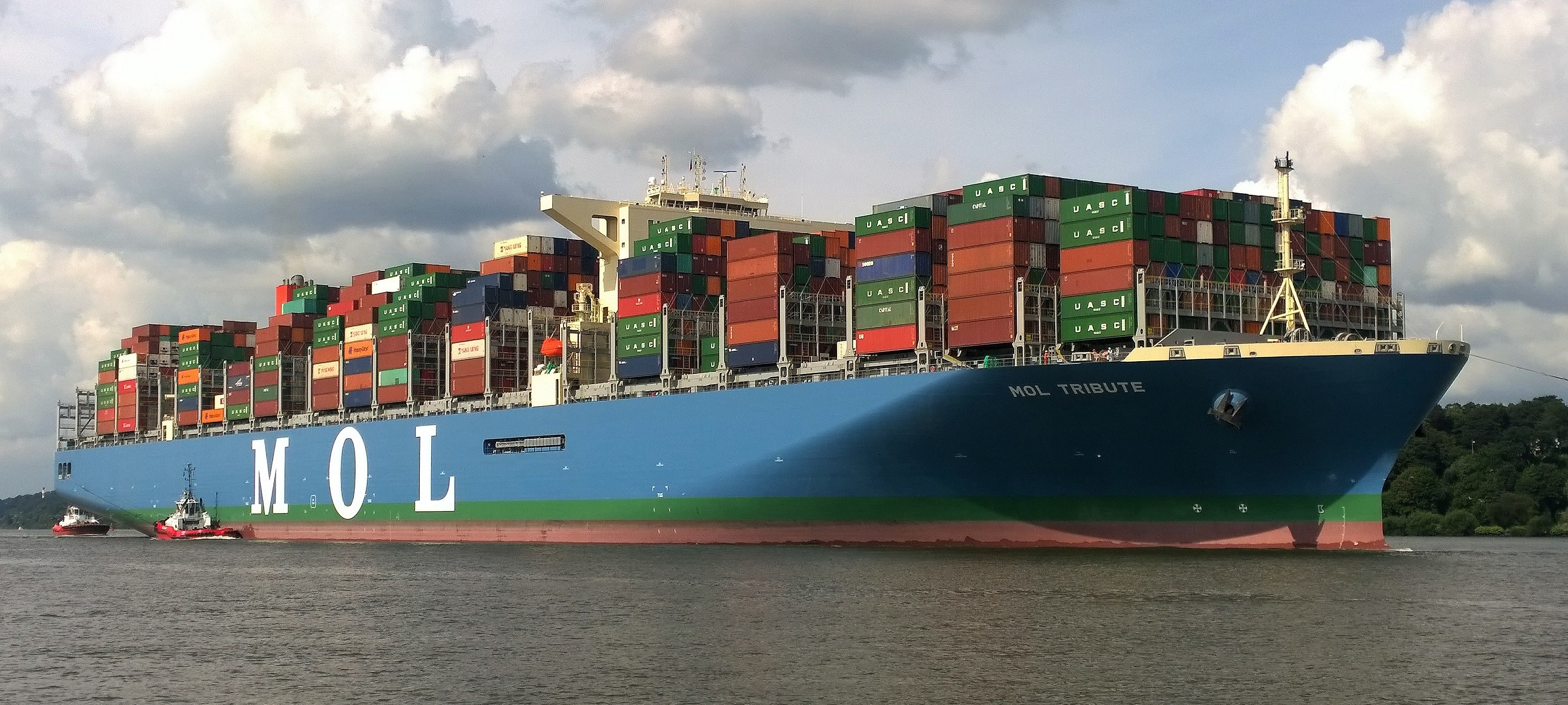
Container ship MOL on the river Elbe with destination to the Harbour of Hamburg

==== Port of Hamburg ====
===== Impacts of climate change =====
It exists high uncertainty concerning the impacts of climate change on the local scale of the Port of Hamburg. A rise in sea level is expected to cause increased tidal range as well as higher flood current speed which will have effects on the water level of the Elbe river. Higher quantities of precipitation and extreme rainfalls related to climate change can lead to increased groundwater potential. Lower precipitation which is also likely can cause higher upstream transportation of sediments.

Floods caused by storm floods, rise in water level due to climate change related sea level rise, higher precipitation and extreme rainfall can lead to disruption of transportation and can have negative effects on industries that depend on harbours. Stronger winds can complicate the storage of empty containers as well as navigation in the Harbour of Hamburg. Inland water transport can be hampered by the rise in sea level as for example the passing underneath bridges might not be possible any more for bigger ships. Increased sediment deposit can lead to lower water level which will limit the size of suitable ships. In contrast, higher air temperature and ice melting can have positive effects for the Hamburg Harbour economy. Less ice and snow would cause less damage on buildings and infrastructure in general which means less costs for reparation. Furthermore, less costs for disruption would result. With the melting of ice, a new shorter waterway to Asia would be accessible. This could be a more time and cost-effective alternative to the current shipping route.

===== Adaptation strategies =====
For the implementation of adaptation strategies, it has to be dealt with a high uncertainty concerning the changes, the assessment of their likelihood as well as the calculation of the necessary resources. For the protection against increased floods and storm floods, on the one hand, technical solutions such as further dykes and the fortification of existing ones, flood barriers and on the other hand, the restoration of natural flood plains are being discussed. It might be necessary to raise existing bridges, roads and railways to ensure the crossability for bigger ships. Drainage systems will have to be adapted in order to deal with longer and higher storm floods as well as with higher middle Elbe water level. For the increased sediment transport, a regular maintenance of the water way in order to maintain a shippable water level will be necessary.
