= Climate change adaptation =

Process of adjusting to effects of climate change

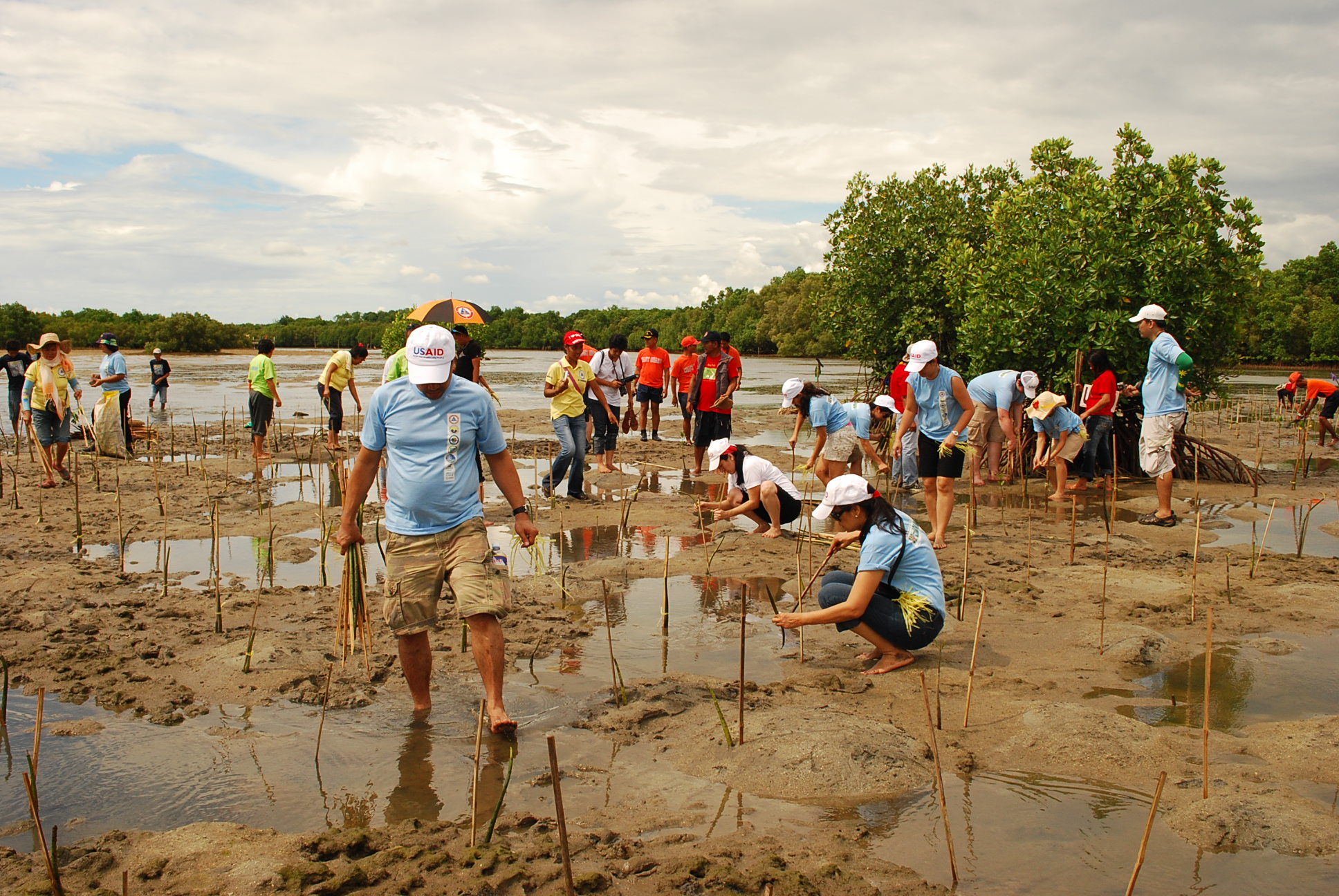
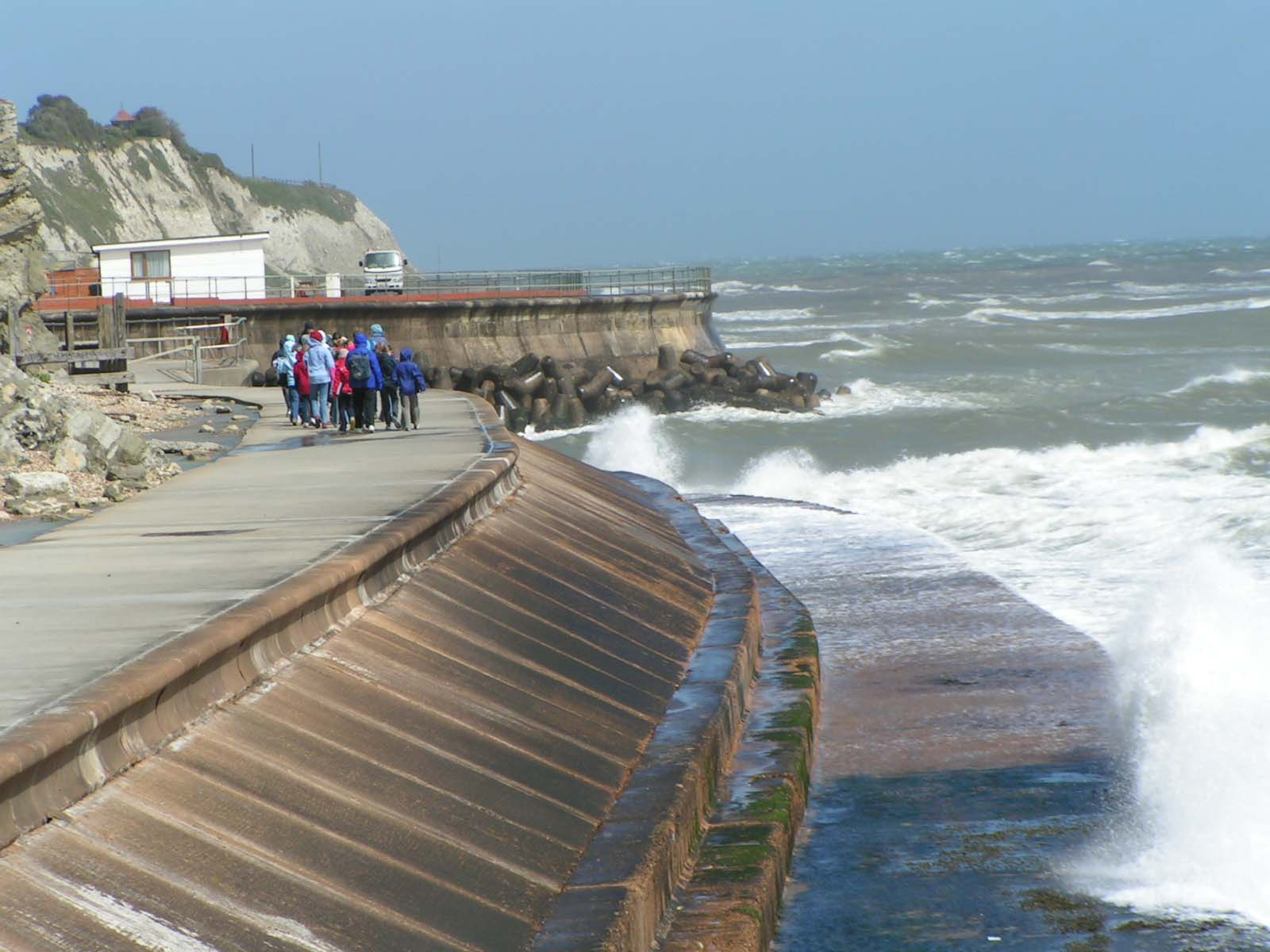
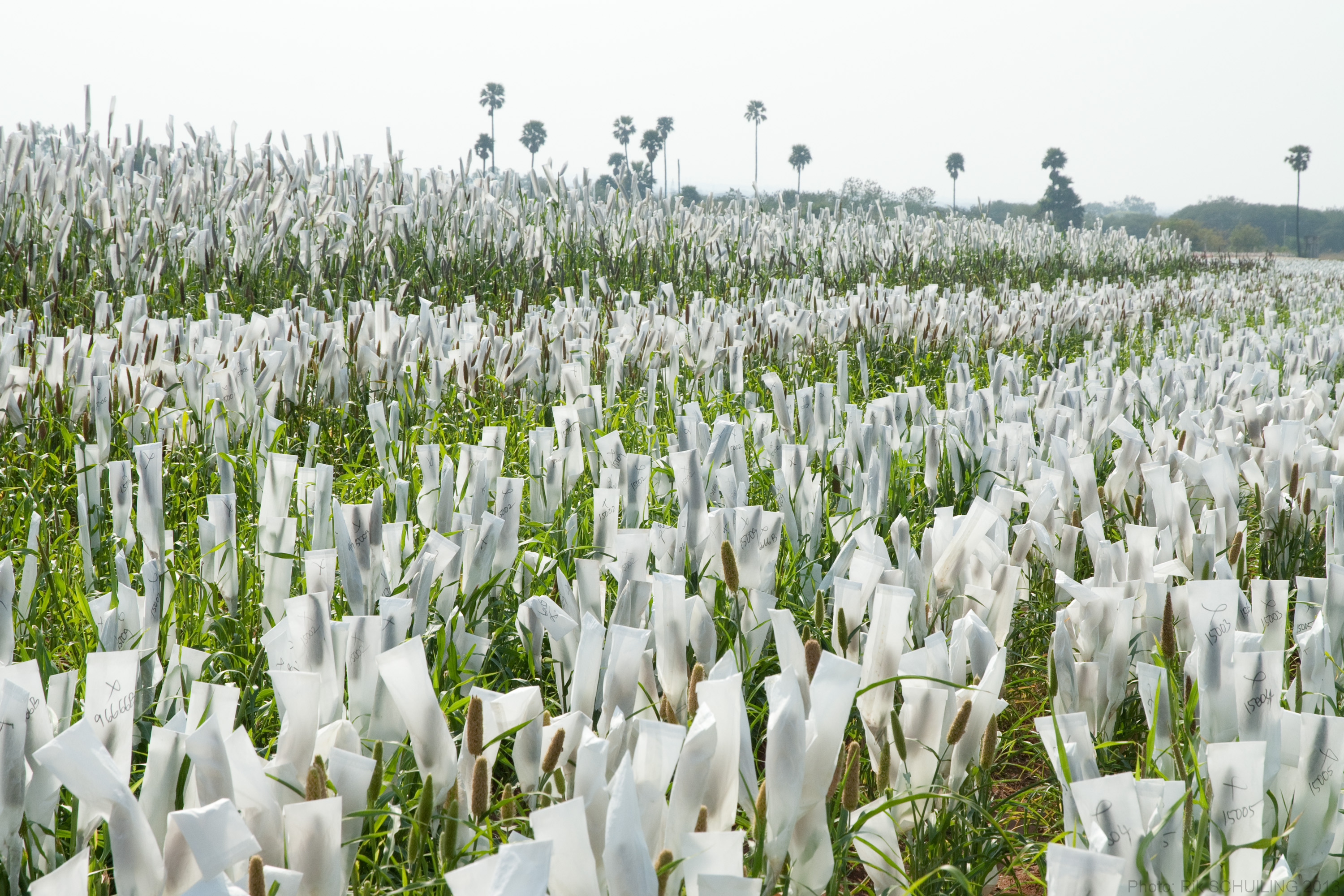
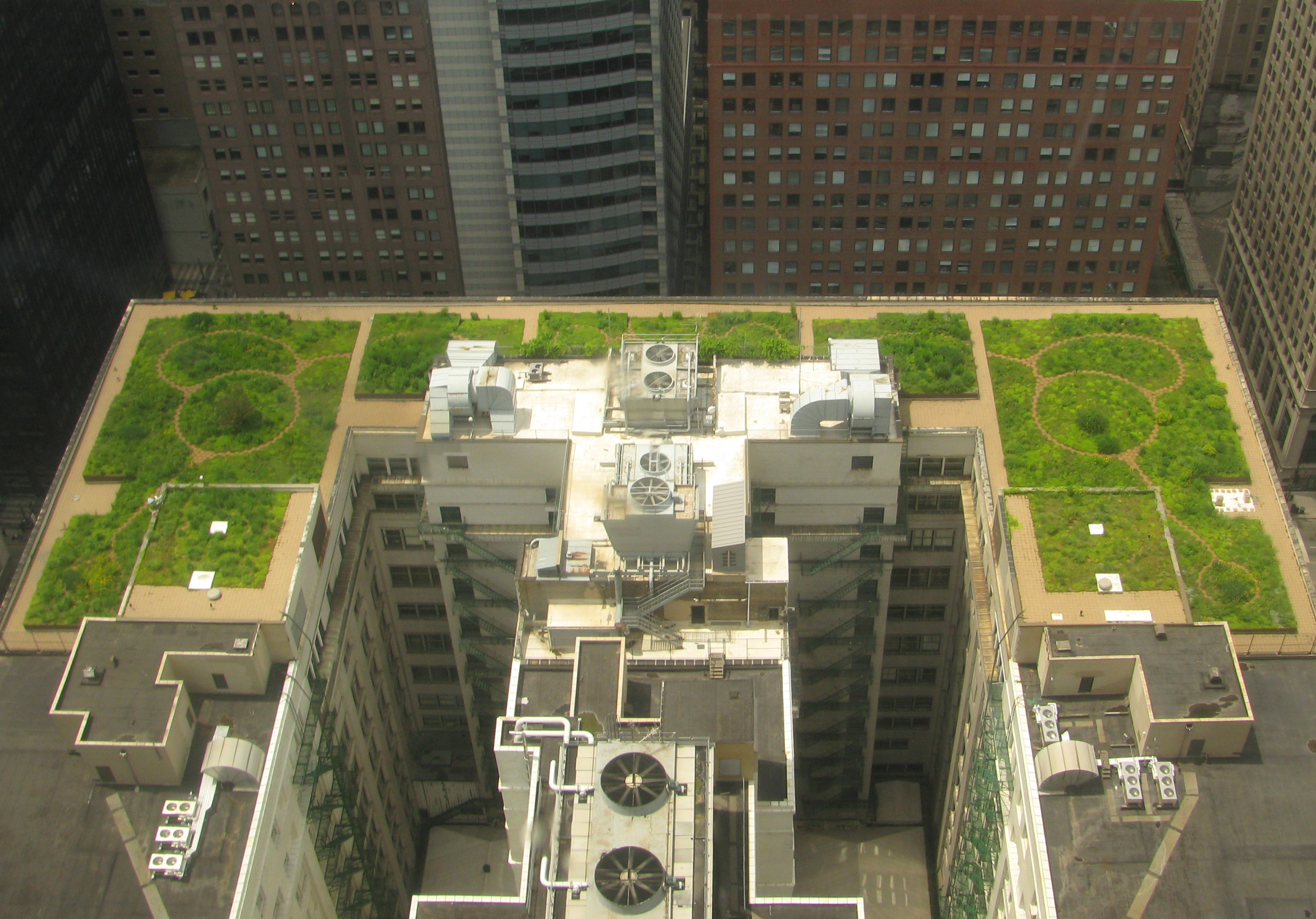
Adapting to climate change involves infrastructural, institutional, behavioral and nature-based approaches. Examples shown here from top left are mangrove planting and habitat conservation, building seawalls to protect against sea level rise, selective breeding for drought-resistant crops, and building green roofs to reduce urban heat island effects.

Climate change adaptation is the process of adjusting to the effects of climate change, both current and anticipated. Adaptation aims to moderate or avoid harm for people, and is usually done alongside climate change mitigation. It also aims to exploit opportunities. Adaptation can involve interventions to help natural systems cope with changes.

Adaptation can help manage impacts and risks to people and nature. The four types of adaptation actions are infrastructural, institutional, behavioural and nature-based options. Some examples are building seawalls or inland flood defenses, providing new insurance schemes, changing crop planting times or varieties, and installing green roofs or green spaces. Adaptation can be reactive (responding to climate impacts as they happen) or proactive (taking steps in anticipation of future climate change).

The need for adaptation varies from place to place. Adaptation measures vary by region and community, depending on specific climate impacts and vulnerabilities. Worldwide, people living in rural areas are more exposed to food insecurity owing to limited access to food and financial resources. For instance, coastal regions might prioritize sea-level rise defenses and mangrove restoration. Arid areas could focus on water scarcity solutions, land restoration and heat management. The needs for adaptation will also depend on how much the climate changes or is expected to change. Adaptation is particularly important in developing countries because they are most vulnerable to climate change. Adaptation needs are high for food, water and other sectors important for economic output, jobs and incomes. One of the challenges is to prioritize the needs of communities, including the poorest, to help ensure they are not disproportionately affected by climate change.

Adaptation plans, policies or strategies are in place in more than 70% of countries. Recent research indicates that while global awareness and planning for climate change adaptation have increased, the actual implementation of adaptation measures remains limited and uneven across regions. Agreements like the Paris Agreement encourage countries to develop adaptation plans. Other levels of government like cities and provinces also use adaptation planning. So do economic sectors. Donor countries can give money to developing countries to help develop national adaptation plans. Effective adaptation is not always autonomous; it requires substantial planning, coordination, and foresight. Studies have identified key barriers such as knowledge gaps, behavioral resistance, and market failures that slow down adaptation progress and require strategic policy intervention. Addressing these issues is crucial to prevent long-term vulnerabilities, especially in urban planning and infrastructure investments that determine resilience to climate impacts. Furthermore, adaptation is deeply connected to economic development, with decisions in industrial strategy and urban infrastructure shaping future climate vulnerability.

== Definition ==
The IPCC defines climate change adaptation in this way:

- "In human systems, as the process of adjustment to actual or expected climate and its effects in order to moderate harm or take advantage of beneficial opportunities."
- "In natural systems, adaptation is the process of adjustment to actual climate and its effects; human intervention may facilitate this."

Adaptation actions can be incremental and transformative. Incremental actions are actions that aim to maintain the essence and integrity of a system. Transformative actions are actions that change the fundamental attributes of a system in response to climate change and its impacts.

== Understanding the need ==
Research on climate change adaptation has been ongoing since the 1990s. The number and variety of subtopics has greatly increased since then. Adaptation has become an established policy area in the 2010s and since the Paris Agreement, and an important topic for policy research.

=== Climate change impacts research ===
Scientific research into climate change adaptation generally starts with analyses of the likely effects of climate change on people, ecosystems, and the environment. These impacts cover its effects on lives, livelihoods, health and well-being, ecosystems and species, economic, social and cultural assets, and infrastructure. Impacts may include changed agricultural yields, increased floods, and droughts or coral reef bleaching. Analysis of such impacts is an important step in understanding current and future adaptation needs and options.

As of 2022, the level of warming is 1.2 °C (34.2 °F) above levels before the industrial revolution. It is on track to increase to 2.5 to 2.9 °C (36.5 to 37.2 °F) by the end of the century. This is causing a variety of secondary effects.

Many negative effects of climate change involve changes in extremes or the way conditions vary rather than changes in average conditions. For example, the average sea level in a port might not be as important as the height of water during a storm surge. That is because a storm surge can cause flooding. The average rainfall in an area might not be as important as how frequent and severe droughts and extreme precipitation events become.

=== Disaster risks, response and preparedness ===
Climate change contributes to disaster risk. Therefore, experts often see climate change adaptation as one of many processes within disaster risk reduction. In turn, disaster risk reduction is part of the broader consideration of sustainable development. Climate change adaptation and disaster risk reduction have similar goals (to reduce potential impacts of hazards and increase the resilience of people at risk). They use similar concepts and are informed by similar sources and studies.

Disasters are often triggered by natural hazards. A natural event such as a fire or flood is not of itself a disaster: it's only when it affects people or is caused by them that is counts as a disaster. It is argued that natural disasters are always linked to human action or inaction or rooted in anthropogenic processes. Disasters, economic loss, and the underlying vulnerabilities that drive risk are increasing. Global risks like climate change are having major impacts everywhere. Scientists forecast climate change will increase the frequency and severity of extreme weather events and disasters. Adaptation may include measures to increase preparedness and relevant disaster response capacities.

== Aims ==
For humans, adaptation aims to moderate or avoid harm, and to exploit opportunities. For natural systems, humans may intervene to help adjustment.

=== Policy aims ===
The Paris Agreement of 2015 requires countries to keep global temperature rise this century to less than 2 °C above pre-industrial levels, and to pursue efforts to limit the temperature increase to 1.5 °C. Even if greenhouse gas emissions are stopped relatively soon, global warming and its effects will last many years. This is due to the inertia of the climate system. So both carbon neutrality ("net zero") and adaptation are necessary.

The Global Goal on Adaptation was also established under the Paris Agreement. Following the two-year UAE–Belém work programme, parties at COP30 adopted 59 voluntary indicators (known as the Belém Adaptation Indicators) to track progress under the Global Goal on Adaptation across areas such as water security, food production, health, and disaster protection. At COP31 in Antalya in November 2026, negotiations focused on operationalizing these indicators under the Belém–Addis Vision on Adaptation and scaling up grant-based adaptation finance, building on commitments to at least triple adaptation funding for developing countries by 2035.It will support the long-term adaptation goals of the governments that are parties to the agreement. It also aims to fund support for the most vulnerable countries' adaptation needs in the context of the 1.5/2 °C goal. It has three core components. These are reducing vulnerability to climate change, enhancing adaptive capacity, and strengthening resilience.

=== Reduce risk factors: vulnerability and exposure ===
Adaptation can help decrease climate risk by addressing three interacting risk factors. These are hazards, vulnerability, and exposure. Adaptation addresses the risks of climate impacts that arise from the way climate-related hazards interact with the exposure and vulnerability of human and ecological systems. Exposure refers to the presence of people, livelihoods, ecosystems and other assets in places that could suffer negative effects. It is possible to reduce exposure by retreating from areas with high climate risks, such as floodplains. Improving systems for early warnings and evacuations are other ways to reduce exposure. The IPCC defines climate change vulnerability as "the propensity or predisposition to be adversely affected" by climate change. It can apply to humans but also to natural systems. Human and ecosystem vulnerability are interdependent. According to the IPCC, climate change vulnerability encompasses a variety of concepts and elements, including sensitivity or susceptibility to harm and lack of capacity to cope and adapt. Sensitivity to climate change could be reduced by for example increasing the storage capacity of a reservoir, or planting crops that are more resistant to climate variability. It is also possible to reduce vulnerability in towns and cities with green garden spaces. These can reduce heat stress and food insecurity for low-income neighbourhoods.

Ecosystem-based adaptation is one way to reduce vulnerability to climate hazards. For instance, mangroves can dampen storm energy. So they can help prevent flooding. In this way, protection of the mangrove ecosystem can be a form of adaptation. Insurance and livelihood diversification increase resilience and decrease vulnerability. Other ways to decrease vulnerability include strengthening social protection and building infrastructure more resistant to hazards.

=== Increase adaptive capacity ===
Adaptive capacity in the context of climate change covers human, natural, or managed systems. It looks at how they respond to both climate variability and extremes. It covers the ability of a system to adjust to climate change to moderate potential damages, to take advantage of opportunities, or to cope with consequences. Adaptive capacity is the ability to reduce the likelihood of negative impacts of climate-related hazards. It does this through the ability to design and implement effective adaptation strategies, or to react to evolving hazards and stresses.

Societies that can respond to change quickly and successfully have a high adaptive capacity. Conversely, high adaptive capacity does not necessarily lead to successful adaptation action. It does not necessarily succeed in goals of equity and enhancing well-being.

In general, adaptation capacity differs between high and low-income countries. By some indices such as ND-GAIN, high-income countries tend to have higher adaptive capacity. However, there is strong variation within countries.

The determinants of adaptive capacity include:

- Economic resources: Wealthier nations are better able to bear the costs of adaptation to climate change than poorer ones.
- Technology: Lack of technology can impede adaptation.
- Information and skills: Information and trained personnel are necessary to assess and implement successful adaptation options.
- Social infrastructure
- Institutions: Nations with well-developed social institutions are likely to have greater adaptive capacity than those with less effective institutions. These are typically developing nations and economies in transition.
- Equity: Some believe that adaptive capacity is greater where there are government institutions and arrangements in place that allow equitable access to resources.

=== Strengthening resilience ===
The IPCC considers climate resilience to be "the capacity of social, economic and ecosystems to cope with a hazardous event or trend or disturbance". It includes the abilities to reorganise and learn. This definition is similar to that of climate change adaptation. However, resilience involves a more systematic approach to absorbing change. It involves using those changes to become more efficient. The idea is that people can intervene to reorganise the system when disturbance creates an opportunity to do so.

Implemented adaptation most often builds upon resilience as a way of bouncing back to recover after a disturbance. Experts consider it to be incremental rather than transformational. On the other hand, climate resilience-focused projects can be activities to promote and support transformational adaptation. This is because transformational adaptation is connected with implementation at scale and ideally at the system-level.

Strengthening resilience is therefore important for maintaining a capacity for transformation. Transformations, and the processes of transition, cover the major systems and sectors at scale. These are energy, land and ecosystems, urban and infrastructure, and industrial and societal. Transformations may fail if they do not integrate social justice, consider power differences and political inclusion, and if they do not deliver improvements in incomes and wellbeing for everyone.

Climate resilient development is a closely related area of work and research topic that has recently emerged. It describes situations in which adaptation, mitigation and development solutions are pursued together. It is able to benefit from synergies from among the actions and reduce trade-offs.

=== Co-benefits with mitigation ===
Strategies to limit climate change are complementary to efforts to adapt to it. Limiting warming, by reducing greenhouse gas emissions and removing them from the atmosphere, is also known as climate change mitigation. There are some synergies or co-benefits between adaptation and mitigation. Synergies include the benefits of public transport for both mitigation and adaptation. Public transport has lower greenhouse gas emissions per kilometer travelled than cars. A good public transport network also increases resilience in case of disasters. This is because evacuation and emergency access becomes easier. Reduced air pollution from public transport improves health. This in turn may lead to improved economic resilience, as healthy workers perform better.

A study published in 2025 estimated global mean surface temperature change due to energy-related adaption from 2020 through 2099 at about 0.07-0.12 °C less than baseline assumptions on the basis of various emission assumptions. This was because there would be a reduction in energy use for heating in cold environments which will exceed the increase in energy use for cooling in warm environments.

== Options by type of action ==
There are many adaptation responses. We sometimes call them adaptation measures, strategies or solutions. They help manage impacts and risks to people and nature.

Current adaptation focuses on near-term climate risks. It also focuses on particular sectors, such as water and agriculture, and on regions, such as Africa and Asia. It is important to close gaps between adaptation that is carried out and the needs relative to today's climate in order to reduce risks to a tolerable level. However, future adaptation must also anticipate future climate change risks. Some options may become less effective or entirely unfeasible as global warming increases.

Adaptation responses fall into four categories that all directly aim to reduce risks and exploit opportunities:

1. Infrastructural and technological adaptation (including engineering, built environment, and high-tech solutions);
2. Institutional adaptation (economic organizations, laws and regulation, government policies and programmes);
3. Behavioural and cultural (individual and household strategies as well as social and community approaches);
4. Nature-based solutions (including ecosystem-based adaptation options).

We can also group options into three categories:

1. Structural and physical adaptation (including engineering and built environment, technological, ecosystem-based, services);

2. Social adaptation (educational, informational, behavioural);

3. Institutional adaptation (economic organizations, laws and regulation, government policies and programmes).

Other ways to distinguish types of adaptation are anticipatory versus reactive, autonomous versus planned and incremental versus transformational.

- Incremental adaptation actions aim to maintain the essence and integrity of a system. Transformative actions change the fundamental attributes of a system in response to climate change and its impacts.
- Autonomous adaptation is adaptation response to experienced climate and its effects. It does not involve explicit planning and does not specifically focus on addressing climate change. Planned adaptation can be reactive or anticipatory. Anticipatory adaptation is undertaken before impacts are apparent. Relying on autonomous adaptation to climate change can result in substantial costs. It is possible to avoid many of these costs with planned adaptation.

=== Infrastructural and technological options ===
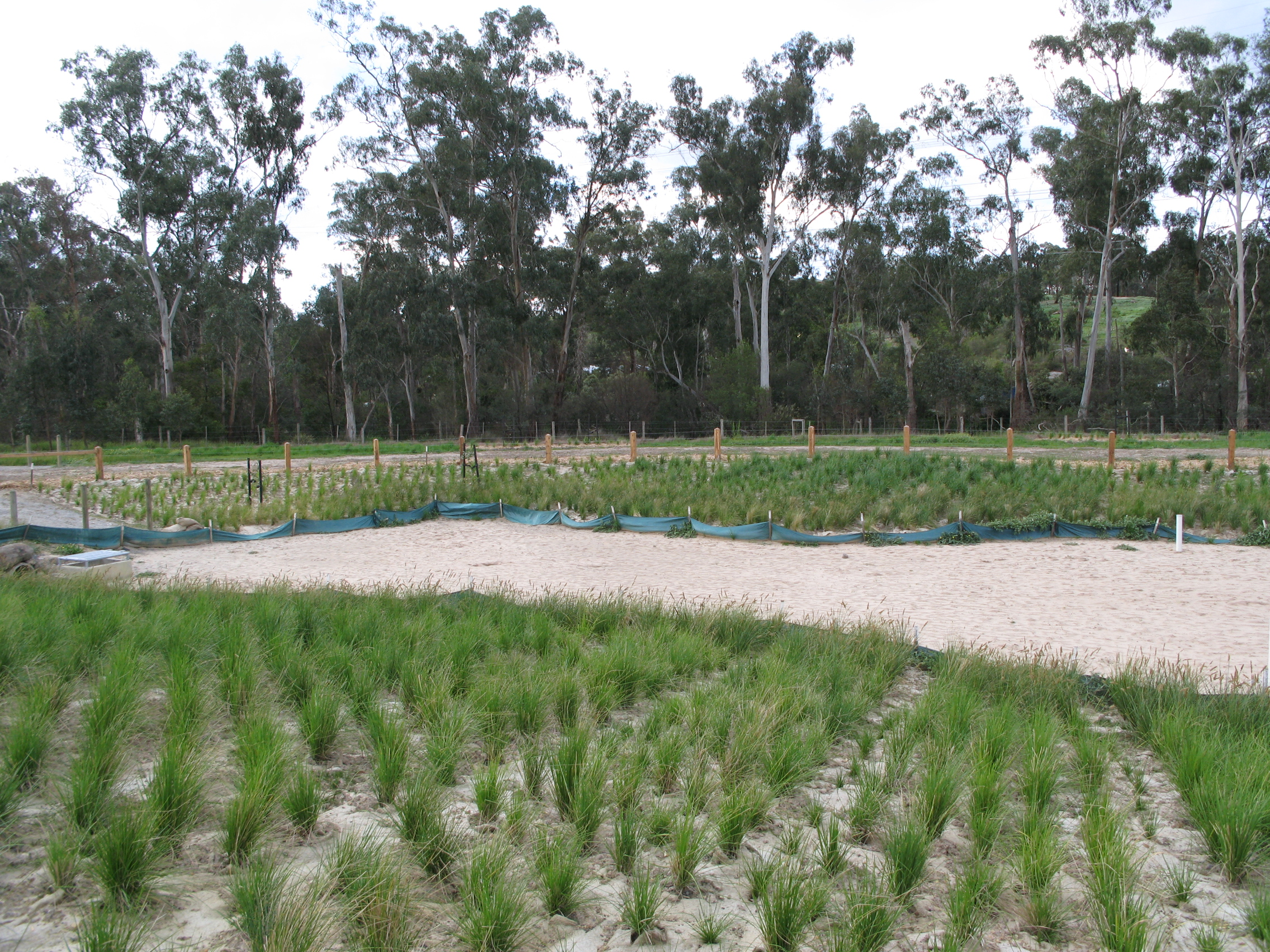
Wetland restoration in Australia

==== Built environment ====
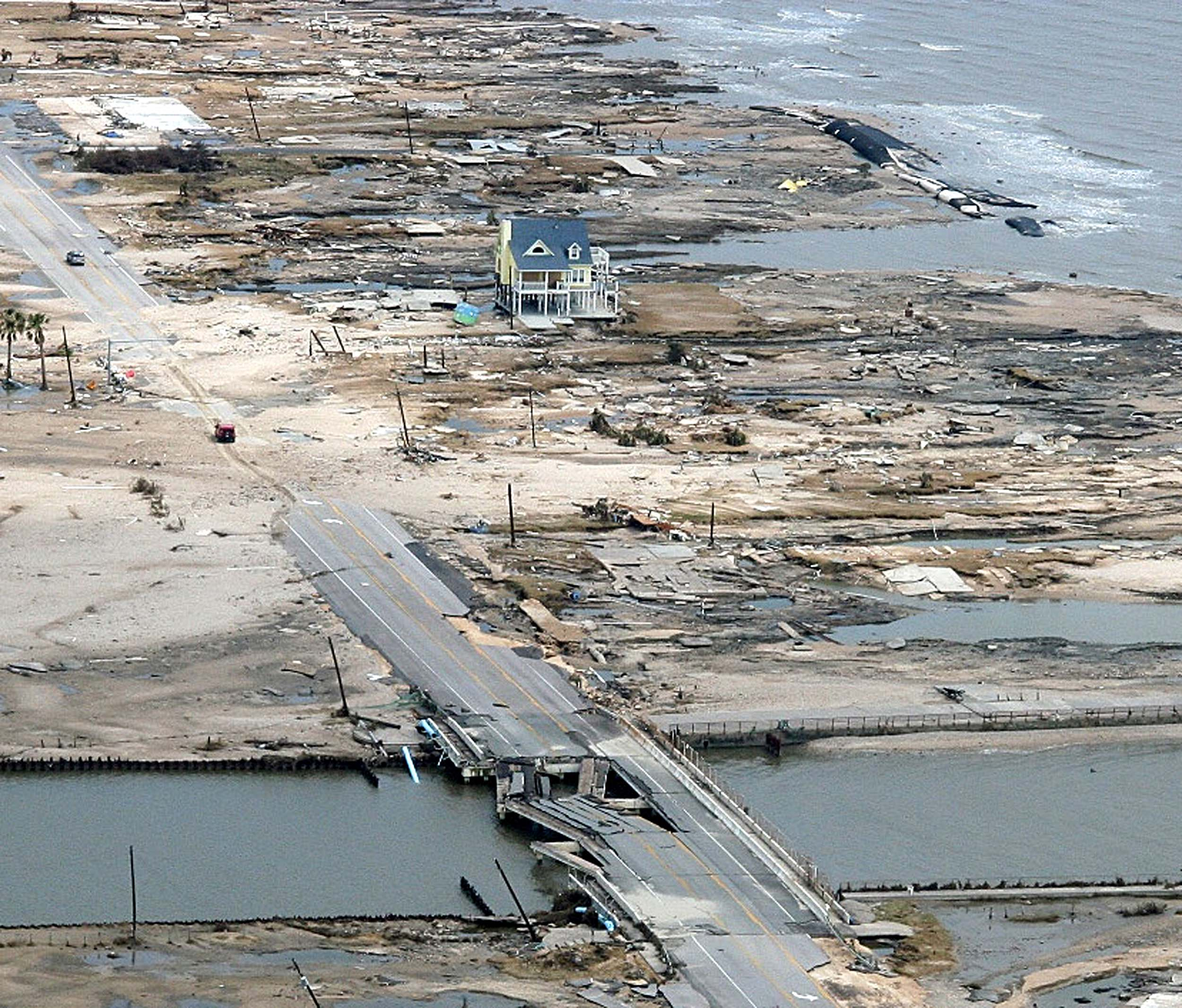
This house survived Hurricane Ike (2008), having been rebuilt to withstand Category 5 hurricanes after being destroyed by Hurricane Rita three years earlier.

Built environment options include installing or upgrading infrastructure to protect against flooding, sea level rise, heatwaves and extreme heat. They also include infrastructure to respond to changed rainfall patterns in agriculture. This could be infrastructure for irrigation.

A survey conducted in the European Union revealed that 39% of respondents cited the improvement of infrastructure as a key priority for local climate adaptation, which includes measures such as installing better drainage systems, flood barriers, storm shelters, and more resilient power grids. Early warning systems, which may include AI and sensor-based monitoring, are used to identify vulnerabilities in infrastructure and support adaptive measure. Climate change adaptation is on the agenda of European municipal governments. However, apart from new agencies being established with expertise on climate change adaptation and urban planning, the adaptation of the built environment results in significant changes to the daily work of a city's administrative staff.

==== Early warning systems ====
Because of changes in extreme weather and sea level rise, due to climate change, the UN has recommended early warning systems as key elements of climate change adaptation and climate risk management. Flooding, cyclones and other rapidly changing weather events can make communities in coastal areas, along flood zones and reliant on agriculture very vulnerable to extreme events. To this end the UN is running a partnership titled "Climate Risk and Early Warning Systems" to aid high risk countries with neglected warning systems in developing them.

European countries have also seen early warning systems help communities adapt to drought, heat waves, disease, fire, and other related effects of climate change. Similarly the WHO recommends early warning systems to prevent increases in heatwave related morbidity and disease outbreaks.

==== Climate services ====
Climate information services (CIS) entail the dissemination of climate data in a way that aids people and organizations in making decisions. CIS helps its users foresee and control the hazards associated with a changing and unpredictable climate. It encompasses a knowledge loop that includes targeted user communities' access to, interpretation of, communication of, and use of pertinent, accurate, and trustworthy climate information, as well as their feedback on that use. Climate information services involve the timely production, translation and delivery of useful climate data, information and knowledge.

Climate services are systems to deliver the best available climate information to end-users in the most usable and accessible formats. They aim to support climate change adaptation, mitigation and risk management decisions. There is a vast range of practices and products for interpreting, analyzing, and communicating climate data. They often combine different sources and different types of knowledge. They aim to fulfil a well-specified need. These climate services mark a shift from supply-driven information products that result from scientific research. Instead they are demand-driven and take greater account of users’ needs and decision-making. To do so they require different types of user–producer engagement, depending on what the service aims to deliver. This type of collaboration is called co-design.

=== Institutional options ===
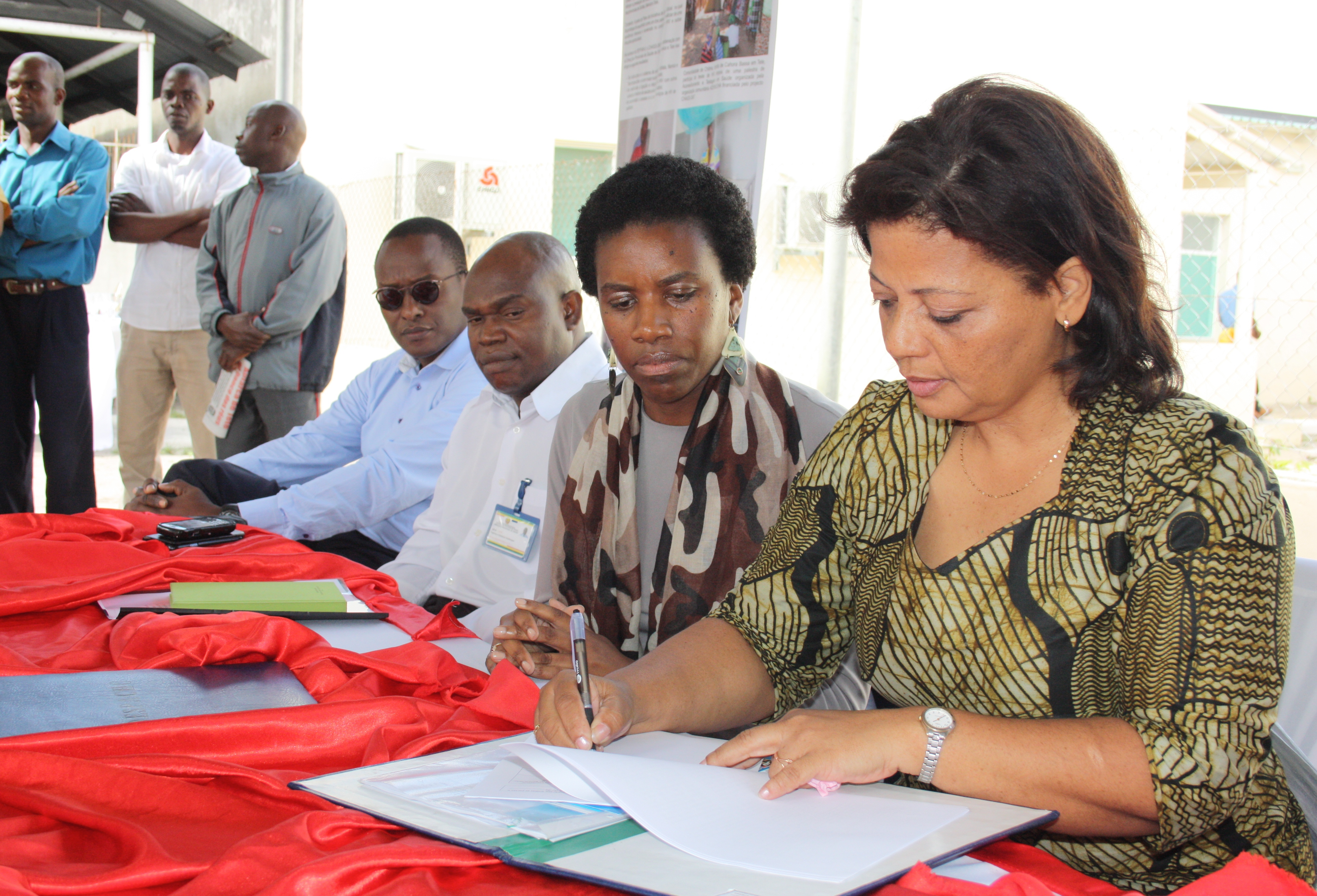
Launching the Coastal City Adaptation Project in Quelimane, Mozambique

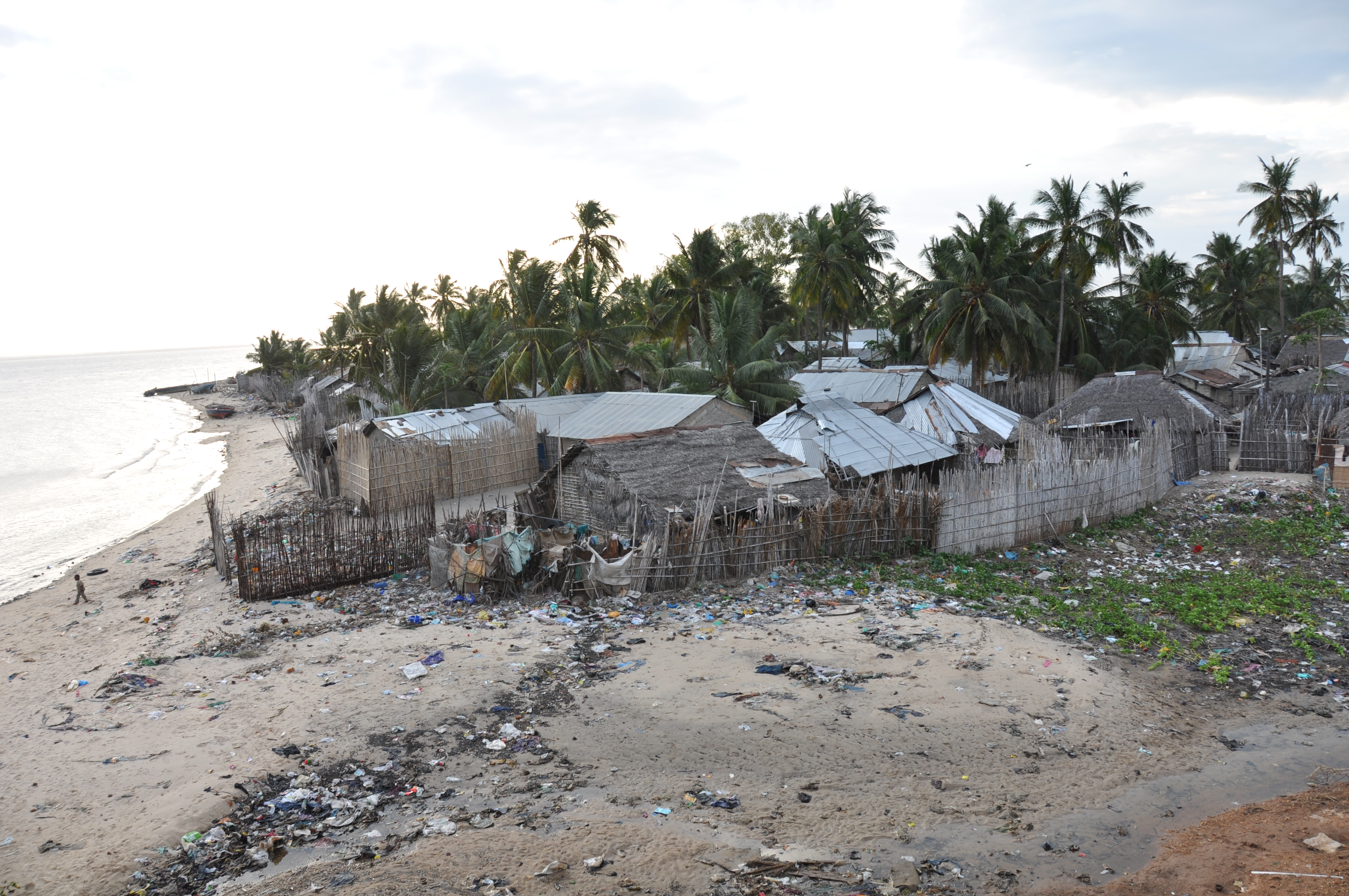
Coastal City Adaptation Project, in Quelimane city, Mozambique. It will improve Quelimane's preparation for events like floods, erosion, sea level rise and other weather and climate related events.

Institutional responses include zoning regulations, new building codes, new insurance schemes, and coordination mechanisms.

Policies are important tools to integrate issues of climate change adaptation. At the national level, adaptation strategies appear in National Adaptation Plans (NAPS) and National Adaptation Programmes of Action (NAPA). They also occur in national climate change policies and strategies. These are at different levels of development in different countries and in cities. This is discussed further in the section below on "implementation".

Cities, states, and provinces often have considerable responsibility in land use planning, public health, and disaster management. Institutional adaptation actions occur more frequently in cities than in other sectors. Some have begun to adapt to threats intensified by climate change, such as flooding, bushfires, heatwaves, and rising sea levels.

==== Building codes ====
Managing the codes or regulations that buildings must conform to is important for keeping people healthy and comfortable during extremes of hot and cold and protecting them from floods. There are many ways to do this. They include increasing the insulation values, adding solar shading, increasing natural ventilation or passive cooling, codes for green roofs to reduce urban heat island effects or requiring waterfront properties to have higher foundations. Land use zoning controls are central to investment in urban development. They can reduce risks to areas threatened by floods and landslides.

==== Insurance ====
Insurance spreads the financial impact of flooding and other extreme weather events. There is an increasing availability of such options. For example, index-based insurance is a new product which triggers payment when weather indices such as precipitation or temperature cross a threshold. It aims to help customers such as farmers deal with production risks. Access to reinsurance may make cities more resilient. Where there are failures in the private insurance market, the public sector can subsidize premiums. One study identified key equity issues for policy considerations:

- Transferring risk to the public purse does not reduce overall risk;
- Governments can spread the cost of losses across time rather than space;
- Governments can force home-owners in low-risk areas to cross-subsidize the insurance premiums of those in high-risk areas;
- Cross-subsidization is increasingly difficult for private sector insurers operating in a competitive market;
- Governments can tax people to pay for tomorrow's disaster.

Government-subsidized insurance, such as the U.S. National Flood Insurance Program, comes under criticism for providing a perverse incentive to develop properties in hazardous areas. This increases overall risk. Insurance can also undermine other efforts such as property level protection and resilience to increase adaptation. Appropriate land-use policies can counter this behavioural effect. These policies limit new construction where there are current or future climate risks. They also encourage the adoption of resilient building codes to mitigate potential damages.

==== Coordination mechanisms ====
Coordination helps achieve goals shared by a range of people or organizations. Examples are information-sharing or joint implementation of adaptation options. Coordination helps use resources effectively. It avoids duplication, promotes consistency across government, and makes it easier for all people and organizations involved to understand the work. In the food production sector, adaptation projects financed through the UNFCCC often include coordination between national governments and administrations at the state, provincial or city level. There are fewer examples of coordination between community-level and national government.

=== Behavioural and cultural options ===
Individuals and households play a central role in adaptation. There are many examples particularly in the global south. Behavioural adaptation is a change in the strategies, practices and actions that help to reduce risk. These can include protecting homes from flooding, protecting crops from drought, and adopting different income-earning activities. Behavioural change is the most common form of adaptation.

==== Change in diets and food waste ====
Food waste spoilage increases with exposure to higher temperatures and humidity. It also increases with extreme events such as flooding and contamination. This can happen at different points in the food supply chain. Thus it can be a risk to food security and nutrition. Adaptation measures can review the production, processing and other handling practices of suppliers. Examples include further sorting to separate damaged products, drying the product for better storage or improved packaging. Other behaviour change options for retailers and consumers include accepting fruit and vegetables that appear less than perfect, redistributing food surpluses, and lowering prices on nearly expired food.

Dietary change options in regions with excess consumption of calories include replacing meat and dairy foods with a higher share of plant-based foods. This has both mitigation and adaptation benefits. Plant-based options have much lower energy and water requirements. Adaptation options can investigate the dietary patterns that are better suited to the regional, socioeconomic and cultural context. Social-cultural norms strongly affect preferences for foods. Policies such as subsidies, taxes, and marketing can also support dietary choices that help adaptation.

==== Change in livelihood strategies ====
Agriculture offers many opportunities for adaptation. These include changing planting times, or changing to crops and livestock that are better adapted to climate conditions and presence of pests. Other examples are breeding more resilient crops and selecting genetically modified crops. All these aim to improve food security and nutrition.

==== Migration and managed retreat ====
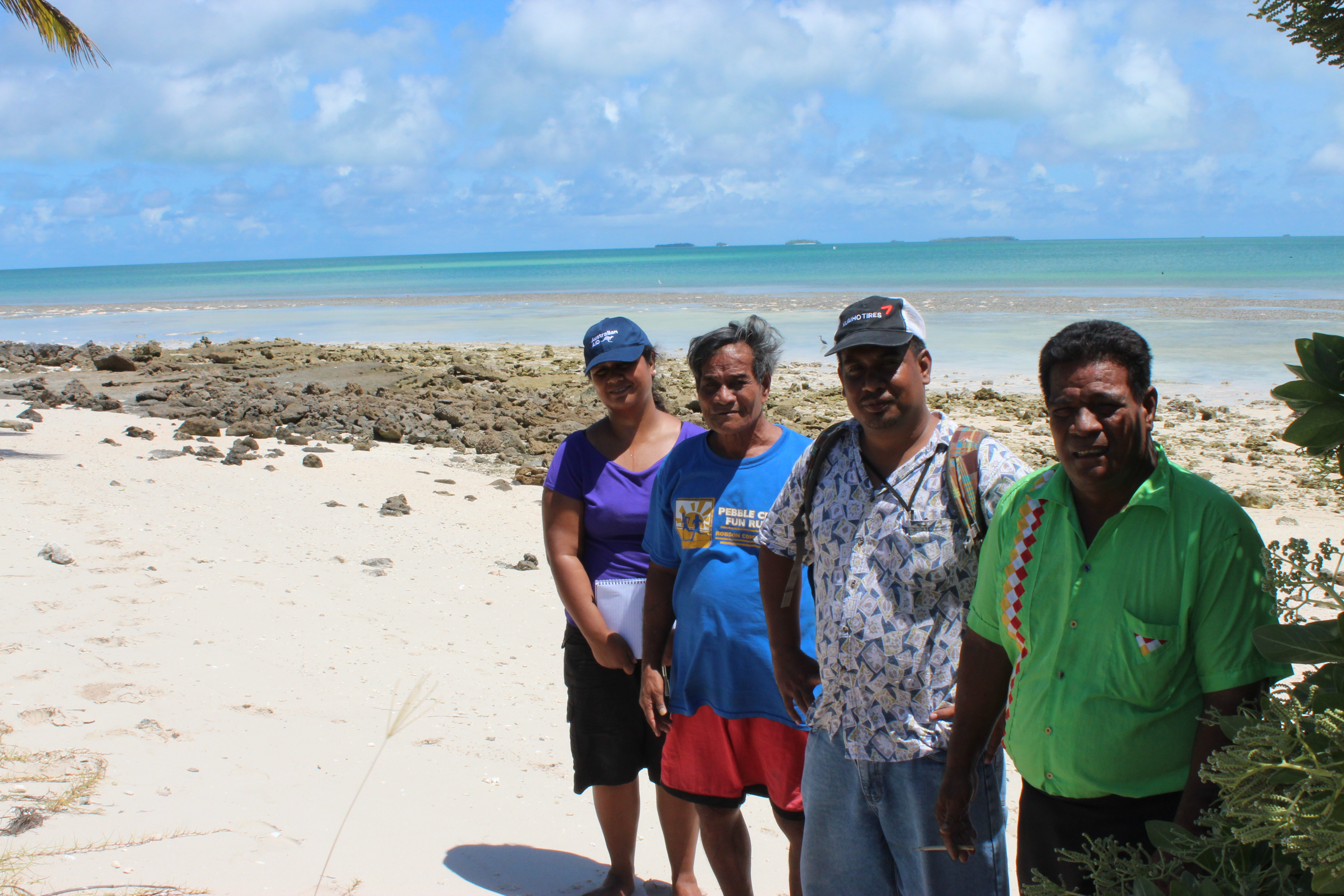
The Government of Kiribati is addressing the threats of climate change to Kiribati, under the Kiribati Adaptation Program. Island nations in the Pacific are particularly vulnerable to sea level rise.

Migration counts as behavioural climate adaptation for some, although others refer to it as a climate response rather: The IPCC Sixth Assessment Report states: "Some responses, such as migration, relocation and resettlement may or may not be considered to be adaptation".

Many factors influence migration decisions. It is difficult to say how much climate change influences migration. The environment is one of many factors. Economic, demographic or political factors are often important in migration decisions. Climate change is an indirect or less important cause.

Seasonal migration or mobility includes traditional strategies such as pastoralism or seeking seasonal employment in urban centres. These are normally voluntary and economically motivated. Weather fluctuations and extremes can influence migration. Weather variability is an important contributor to declines in agricultural incomes and employment. Climate change has made these impacts more likely. As a result, migration has increased, particularly rural to urban movement.

Measures to increase adaptive capacity, such as social protection and promoting women's empowerment, can help people with little power in migration decisions. Sometimes people are unwilling or unable to migrate. In such cases it may be necessary for the government to intervene to keep people safe. This is also referred to as managed retreat.

=== Nature-based options ===
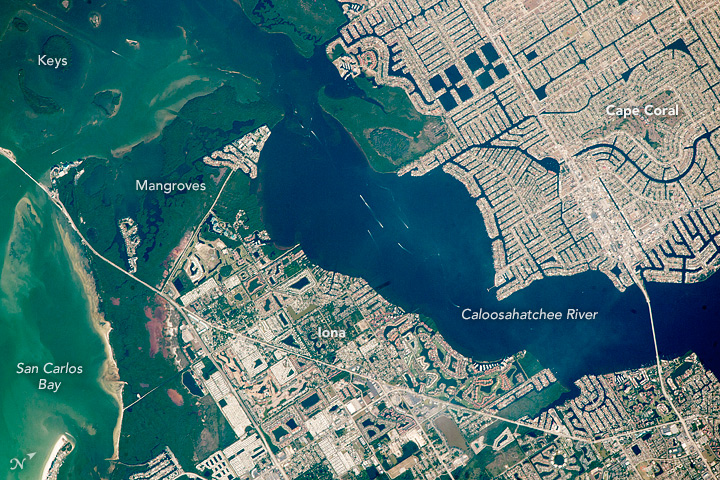
Mangroves protect coastlines against erosion (Cape Coral, Florida, United States)

Nature-based solutions (NBS) work with nature and ecosystems to provide benefits to both societies and overall biodiversity. In the context of climate change, they provide adaptation and mitigation options that benefit and support wild species and habitats. In doing this they often contribute to other sustainable development goals.

Nature-based solutions is an overarching term that includes actions known as ecosystem-based adaptation. However NBS is not restricted to climate change, and often also refers to climate change mitigation. So it is a less specific term. Both approaches require benefits to people and nature to be delivered simultaneously.

==== Supporting ecosystems and biodiversity ====
Ecosystems adapt to global warming depending on their resilience to climate change. Humans can help adaptation in ecosystems in order to strengthen biodiversity. One example is to increase links between ecosystems so that species can migrate on their own to more favourable climate conditions. Another is to assist this migration through human transport of plants or animals. Another example is to use scientific research and development to help coral reefs survive climate change. Protection and restoration of natural and semi-natural areas also helps build resilience, making it easier for ecosystems to adapt.

==== Supporting people and societies ====
Many actions that promote adaptation in ecosystems also help humans adapt via ecosystem-based adaptation and nature-based solutions. For instance, restoration of natural fire regimes makes catastrophic fires less likely and reduces the human exposure to this hazard. Giving rivers more space allows natural systems to store more water. This makes floods in inhabited areas less likely. The provision of green spaces and tree planting creates shade for livestock. There is a trade-off between agricultural production and the restoration of ecosystems in some areas.

== Options by type of impact ==
Some adaptation options tackle specific climate hazards like floods or drought. Other options emerge when there are risks from different hazards as well as other factors that contribute to them such as with migration.

=== Flooding ===
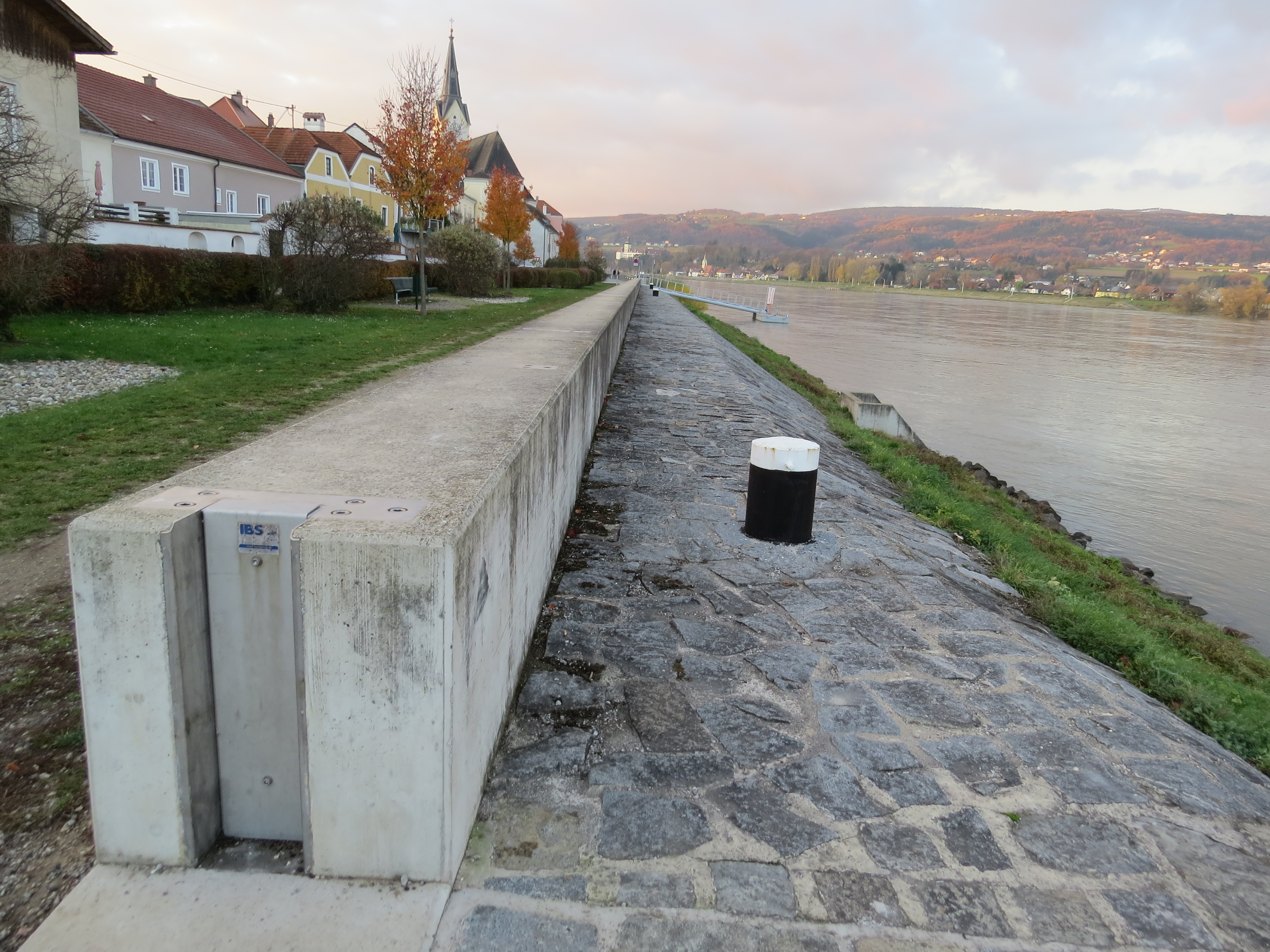
Flood protection for town of Ybbs along the river Donau

Flooding can occur in cities or towns as urban flooding. It can also take place by the sea as coastal flooding. Sea level rise can make coastal flooding worse. In some areas there are also risks of glacial lake outburst floods.

There are many adaptation options for flooding:

- Installing better flood defences such as flood barriers, sea walls and increased pumping capacity
- Installing devices to prevent seawater from backflowing into storm drains
- Rainwater storage to deal with increased run-off from rainfall. This includes reducing paved areas or changing to water-permeable pavements, adding water-buffering vegetation, adding underground storage tanks, and subsidizing household rain barrels
- Raising pumps at wastewater treatment plants
- Buying out homeowners in flood-prone areas
- Raising street level to prevent flooding
- Using and protecting mangroves
- Glacial lakes in danger of outburst flooding can have their moraines replaced with concrete dams to provide protection. This may also provide hydroelectric power

More frequent drenching rains may make it necessary to increase the capacity of stormwater systems. This separates stormwater from blackwater, so that overflows in peak periods do not contaminate rivers. One example is the SMART Tunnel in Kuala Lumpur.

New York City produced a comprehensive report for its Rebuilding and Resiliency initiative after Hurricane Sandy. It includes making buildings less prone to flooding. It also aims to make specific problems encountered during and after the storm less likely to recur. These include weeks-long fuel shortages even in unaffected areas due to legal and transportation problems, flooded health care facilities, insurance premium increases, damage to electricity and steam generation and distribution networks, and flooding of subway and roadway tunnels.

=== Sea level rise ===
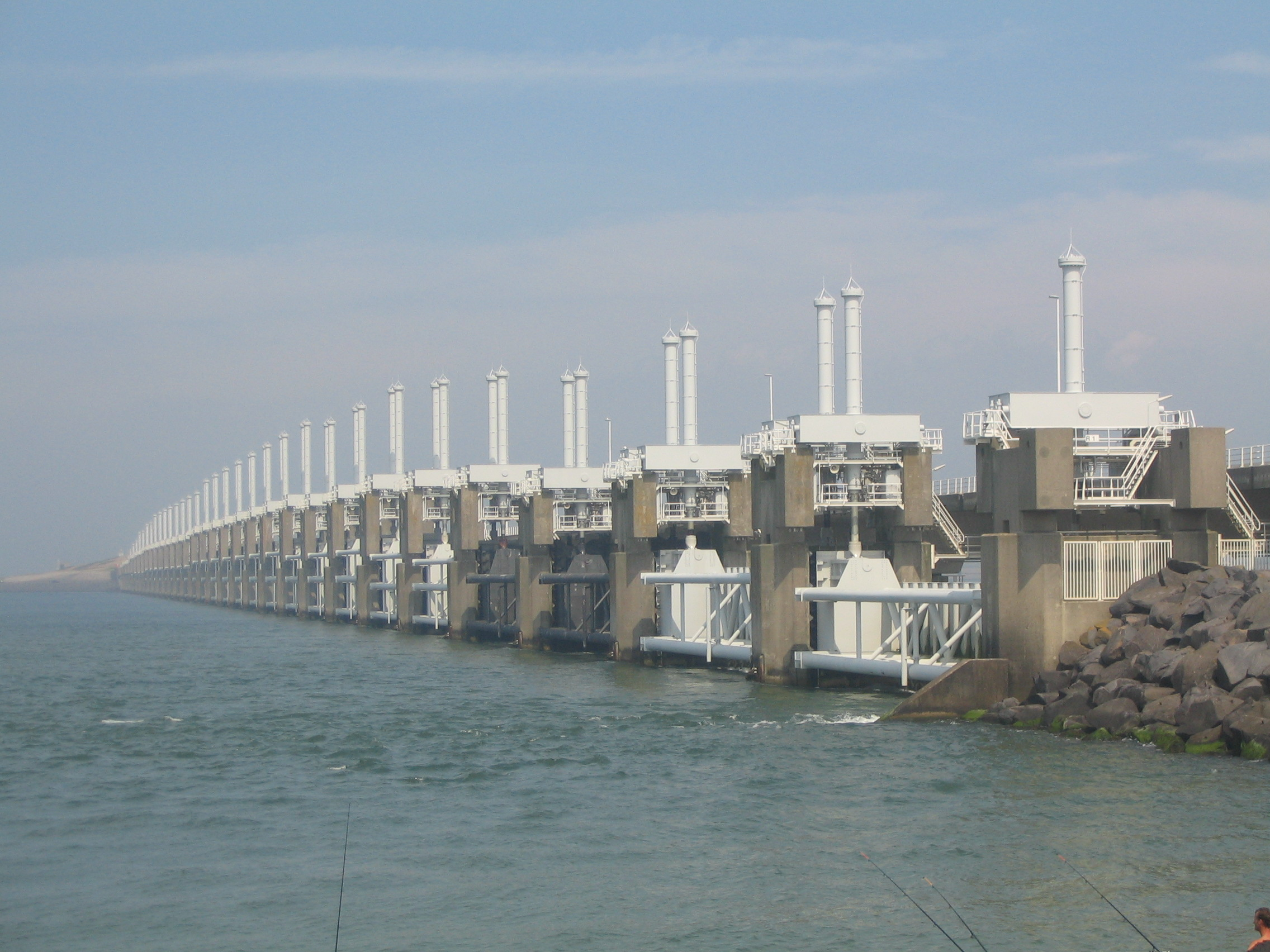
Oosterscheldekering, the largest barrier of the Dutch Delta Works.

Cutting greenhouse gas emissions can slow and stabilize the rate of sea level rise after 2050. This would greatly reduce its costs and damages, but cannot stop it outright. So climate change adaptation to sea level rise is inevitable. The simplest approach is to stop development in vulnerable areas and ultimately move people and infrastructure away from them. Such retreat from sea level rise often results in the loss of livelihoods. The displacement of newly impoverished people could burden their new homes and accelerate social tensions. Some communities are responding to sea-level rise by building protective infrastructure, moving away from the coast, or introducing new policies to support long-term adaptation. At the same time, certain coastal ecosystems such as wetlands can naturally adjust by migrating to higher ground if the surrounding conditions allow. It is important to involve communities in adaptation planning to ensure outcomes are fair and equitable.

Inequalities exist in sea level rise adaptation efforts, as the ability to develop protective strategies is unequally balanced across populations. A study of coastal regions in the United States by natural scientist Jeremy Martinich and his colleagues found that socially vulnerable communities are more likely to be exposed to sea level rise and less likely to receive protection measures, like seawalls or beach nourishment. Adaptation decisions are often made by considering economic value of areas, with higher valued areas more likely to be protected, leaving lower valued areas abandoned and forced to retreat to safer areas.

Inequalities exist in how assistance is distributed after extreme weather events. PBS News reports that in places like Lake Charles, Louisiana, lower income and majority African American neighborhoods have faced repeated storm damage while also experiencing delays and barriers in having access to federal aid and recovery support. Residents described ongoing flooding, repeated home damage, and limited government response compared to other areas also experiencing damage. The report also notes that experts in environmental justice, like Robert Bullard (note: link to Robert Bullard's page here), argue that disaster relief often follows patterns of existing inequalities, where communities with less resources and less political influence receive less effective or slower assistance.

It is possible to avoid or at least delay the retreat from sea level rise with enhanced protections. These include dams, levees or improved natural defenses. Other options include updating building standards to reduce damage from floods, addition of storm water valves to address more frequent and severe flooding at high tide, or cultivating crops more tolerant of saltwater in the soil, even at an increased cost. These options divide into hard and soft adaptation. Hard adaptation generally involves large-scale changes to human societies and ecological systems. It often includes the construction of capital-intensive infrastructure. Soft adaptation involves strengthening natural defenses and local community adaptation. This usually involves simple, modular and locally owned technology. The two types of adaptation may be complementary or mutually exclusive. Adaptation options often require significant investment. But the costs of doing nothing are far greater. One example would involve adaptation against flooding. Effective adaptation measures could reduce future annual costs of flooding in 136 of the world's largest coastal cities from $1 trillion by 2050 without adaptation to a little over $60 billion annually. The cost would be $50 billion per year. Some experts argue that retreat from the coast would have a lower impact on the GDP of India and Southeast Asia then attempting to protect every coastline, in the case of very high sea level rise.

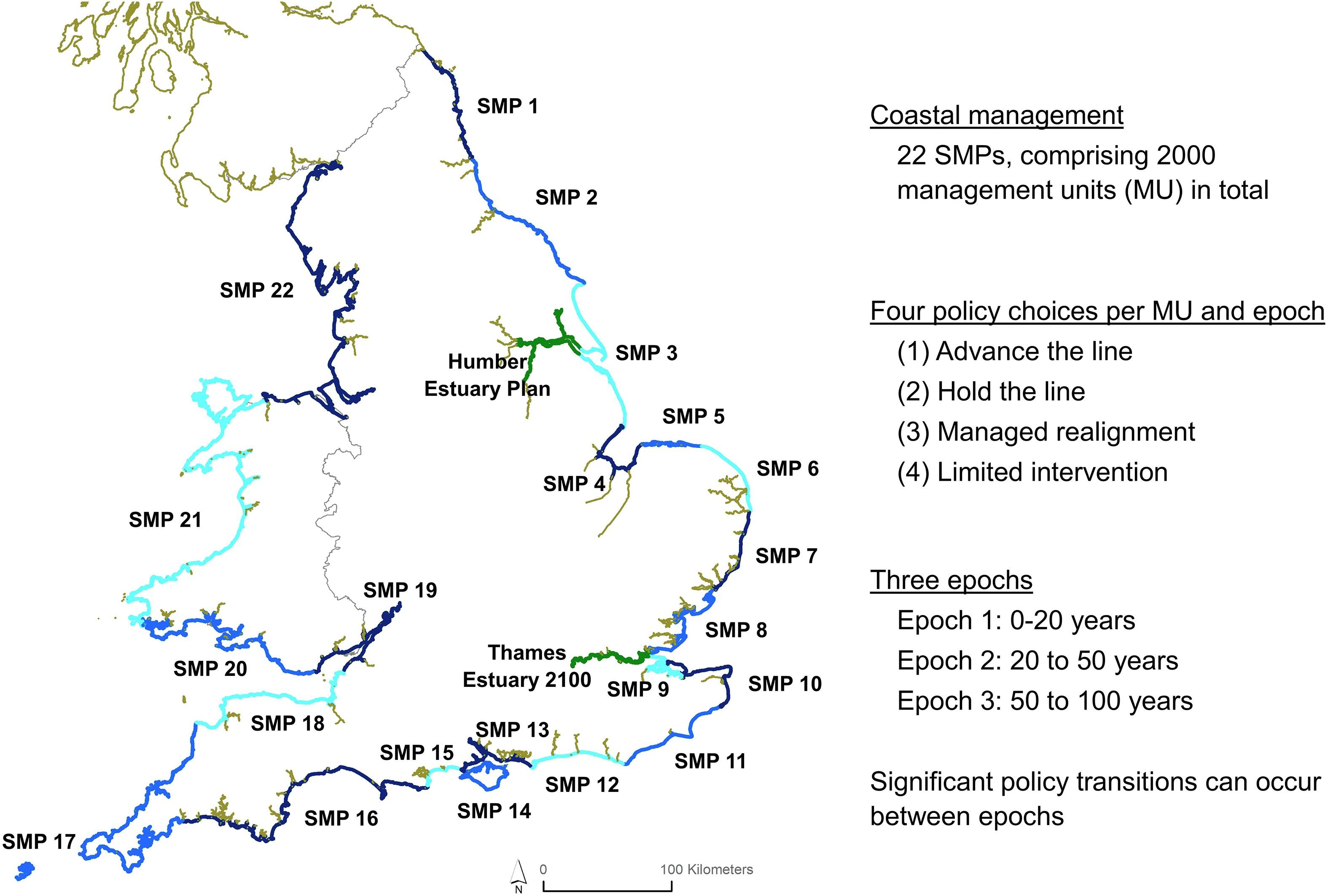
Planning for the future sea level rise used in the United Kingdom.

To be successful, adaptation must anticipate sea level rise well ahead of time. As of 2023, the global state of adaptation planning is mixed. A survey of 253 planners from 49 countries found that 98% are aware of sea level rise projections, but 26% have not yet formally integrated them into their policy documents. Only around a third of respondents from Asian and South American countries have done so. This compares with 50% in Africa, and over 75% in Europe, Australasia and North America. Some 56% of all surveyed planners have plans which account for 2050 and 2100 sea level rise. But 53% use only a single projection rather than a range of two or three projections. Just 14% use four projections, including the one for "extreme" or "high-end" sea level rise. Another study found that over 75% of regional sea level rise assessments from the West and Northeastern United States included at least three estimates. These are usually RCP2.6, RCP4.5 and RCP8.5, and sometimes include extreme scenarios. But 88% of projections from the American South had only a single estimate. Similarly, no assessment from the South went beyond 2100. By contrast 14 assessments from the West went up to 2150, and three from the Northeast went to 2200. 56% of all localities were also found to underestimate the upper end of sea level rise relative to IPCC Sixth Assessment Report.

Related to this, a survey conducted in the European Union indicates that 35% believe they may need to relocate to an area less vulnerable to climate impacts, either locally or internationally, to avoid risks such as rising sea levels and floods, forest fires, or other extreme weather events.

=== Heat waves ===
A 2020 study projects that regions inhabited by one third of the human population could become as hot as the hottest parts of the Sahara within 50 years. This will happen without a change in patterns of population growth and without migration, unless there is a sharp reduction in greenhouse gas emissions to limit warming to 1.5 °C. The most affected regions have little adaptive capacity as of 2020.

Cities are particularly affected by heat waves due to the urban heat island effect. Climate change does not cause urban heat islands. But it leads to more frequent and more intense heat waves which in turn amplify the urban heat island effect in cities. Compact, dense urban development may increase the urban heat island effect. This results in higher temperatures and increased exposure.

Tree cover and green space can reduce heat in cities. They act as sources of shade and promote evaporative cooling. Other options include green roofs, passive daytime radiative cooling applications, and the use of lighter-coloured surfaces and less absorptive building materials in urban areas. These reflect more sunlight and absorb less heat. It may be necessary to change city trees to more heat-tolerant varieties.

Methods for adapting to increased heat include:

- The use and development of air conditioning and cooling systems. Adding air conditioning makes housing, schools and workplaces cooler.
- Solar-energy passive cooling systems for houses and/or refrigeration.

=== Changed rainfall patterns in agriculture ===
Climate change is altering global rainfall patterns. This affects agriculture. Rainfed agriculture accounts for 80% of global agriculture. Many of the 852 million poor people in the world live in parts of Asia and Africa that depend on rainfall to cultivate food crops. Climate change will modify rainfall, evaporation, runoff, and soil moisture storage. Extended drought can cause the failure of small and marginal farms. This results in increased economic, political, and social disruption.

Water availability, including changes in total seasonal precipitation or its pattern of variability, influences agriculture. Moisture stress during flowering, pollination, and grain-filling harms most crops. It is particularly harmful to corn, soybeans, and wheat. Increased evaporation from the soil and accelerated transpiration in the plants themselves will cause moisture stress.

There are many adaptation options. One is to develop crop varieties with greater drought tolerance and another is to build local rainwater storage. Using small planting basins to harvest water in Zimbabwe has boosted maize yields. This happens whether rainfall is abundant or scarce. In Niger, they have led to three or fourfold increases in millet yields. Additionally, a 2023 study in southwestern Ethiopia showed that giving farmers access to agricultural extension services and climate information significantly increases their adoption of adaptation strategies, such as crop diversification and the use of drought resistant crops.

Digital technologies allow farmers to adapt to changing rainfall patterns through remote sensing of soil moisture, IoT-based irrigation control, and data analytics for rainfall forecasting.

Climate change can threaten food security and water security. It is possible to adapt food systems to improve food security and prevent negative impacts from climate change in the future.

==== More spending on irrigation ====
Demand for water for irrigation is likely to rise in a warmer climate. This will increase competition between agriculture and urban and industrial users. Agriculture is already the largest consumer of water in semi-arid regions. Falling water tables and the resulting increase in energy to pump water will make irrigation more expensive. This is particularly the case when drier conditions will require more water per acre. Other strategies can make the most efficient use of water resources. The International Water Management Institute has suggested five strategies that could help Asia feed its growing population in light of climate change. These are modernizing existing irrigation schemes to suit modern methods of farming; supporting farmers' efforts to find their own water supplies by tapping into groundwater in a sustainable way; looking beyond conventional Participatory Irrigation Management schemes by working with the private sector; expanding capacity and knowledge; and investing outside the irrigation sector.

=== Drought and desertification ===
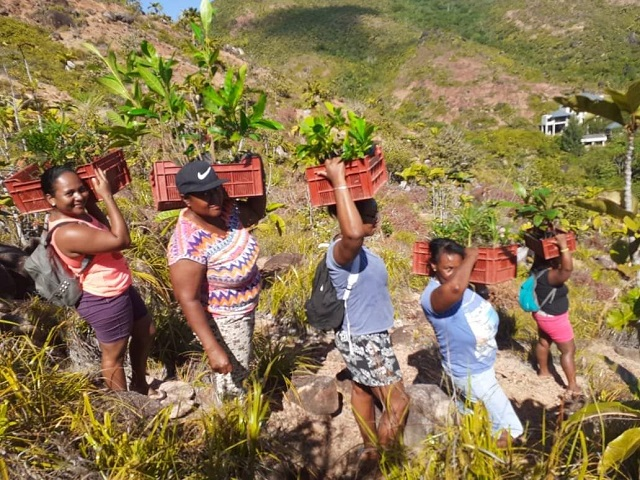
Reforestation activities in Praslin, Seychelles

Reforestation is one way to stop desertification fueled by climate change and non-sustainable land use. One of the most important projects is the Great Green Wall that aims to stop the southward expansion of the Sahara desert. By 2018 only 15% of it had been carried out. But there are already many positive effects. These include the restoration of over 12 million acres (5 million hectares) of degraded land in Nigeria; the planting of roughly 30 million acres of drought-resistant trees across Senegal; and the restoration of 37 million acres of land in Ethiopia. Tree maintenance led to the refilling of groundwater wells with drinking water, additional food supplies for rural towns, and new sources of work and income for villagers.

== Options by sector ==
This section looks at the main sectors and systems affected by climate change. Experts have assessed the risks and adaptation options for them.

=== Ecosystems and their services ===
The main risks to ecosystems from climate change are biodiversity loss, ecosystem structure change, increased tree mortality, increased wildfire, and ecosystem carbon losses. These risks are linked. Loss of species can increase the risks to ecosystem health. Wildfire is an increasing risk for people as well as to ecosystems in many parts of the world. Wildfires and increased pest infestations due to climate change caused much of the recent tree mortality in North America.

Risks to seas and coastal areas include coral bleaching linked with ocean warming. This can change the composition of ecosystems. Coral bleaching and mortality also increase the risks of flooding on nearby shorelines and islands. Ocean acidification attributed to climate change drives change in coral reefs and other ecosystems such as rocky shores and kelp forests.

Ecosystems can respond to climatic and other environmental pressures in different ways. Individual organisms can respond through growth, movement and other developmental processes. Species and populations can relocate or genetically adapt. Human interventions can make ecosystems more resilient and help species adapt. Examples are protecting larger areas of semi-natural habitat and creating links between parts of the landscape to help species move.

Ecosystem-based adaptation actions provide benefits for both ecosystems and humans. They include restoring coastal and river systems to reduce flood risk and improve water quality, creating more green areas in cities to reduce temperatures, and reinstating natural fire regimes to reduce risk of severe wildfires. There are many ways to reduce the risk of disease outbreaks. They include building surveillance systems of pathogens affecting humans, wildlife and farm animals.

==== Assisted migration of plants or animals ====
Assisted migration is the act of moving plants or animals to a different habitat. The destination habitat may or may not have once previously held the species. The only requirement is the destination habitat must provide the bioclimatic requirements to support the species. Assisted migration aims to remove the species from a threatening environment. It aims to give them a chance to survive and reproduce in an environment that does not pose an existential threat to the species.

Assisted migration is a potential solution to changes in environments due to climate change that are faster than natural selection can adapt to. It has the potential to allow species that have poor natural dispersal abilities to avoid extinction. However it has also sparked debate over the possibility of the introduction of invasive species and diseases into previously healthy ecosystems. Despite these debates, scientists and land managers have begun the process of assisted migration for certain species. There have been several studies of the climate adaptive potential of butterflies. A 2023 multi-author review paper analyzed 204 species (mostly plants) that had been subject to intentional, experimental, or inadvertent assisted migration. Among their conclusions: "Despite hesitancy around the tactic, humans have a long history of relocating plants and animals for a variety of reasons (e.g., agriculture, horticulture, forestry, pet trade). Further, Indigenous peoples have been translocating species for millennia. As such, it is somewhat surprising that assisted migration for the purpose of conservation has been subject to so much controversy."

==== Adaptive silviculture for climate change ====
Silviculture is the practice of controlling the growth, composition/structure, and quality of forests to meet the values and needs of landowners and society. Beginning in the 19th century, the dominant goal pertained to sustaining timber production. In the 21st century, goals and practices are expanding to include both climate adaptation and climate change mitigation.

=== Health ===
Climate change-related risks to health include direct risks from extreme weather such as cold waves, storms, or prolonged high temperatures. There are also indirect risks such as mental health impacts of undernutrition or displacement caused by extreme weather. Similarly there are mental health risks from loss of access to green spaces, reduced air quality, or from anxiety about climate change. There are further risks from changes in conditions for transmission of infectious diseases. Malaria and dengue are particularly climate-sensitive.

There are several approaches to adapt to new or increased infectious disease risks. These include vector control through improved housing and better sanitation conditions through WASH services. It could also include insecticide-treated bed nets and indoor spraying. For food-borne diseases it includes food processing and storage.

Adaptation options for heat include expanding access to air conditioning and establishing heat action plans that include early warning systems for heatwaves. Other options are passive cooling systems to include shading and ventilation. These could be part of improved building and urban design and planning, green infrastructure or public cooling centres.

Adaptation options to respond to mental health impacts include increasing funding and access to mental healthcare, incorporating mental health into climate resilience and disaster risk planning, and improving post-disaster support. Mental health also benefits from broader activities such as design of healthy natural spaces, education and cultural activities. It is also closely related to food security and nutrition. Beyond addressing specific health risks, international adaptation frameworks increasingly emphasize building climate-resilient health systems as a whole. These broader systemic approaches include upgrading medical facility infrastructure to withstand extreme weather events, strengthening disease surveillance, and integrating climate risk assessments into national public health planning.

=== Cities ===
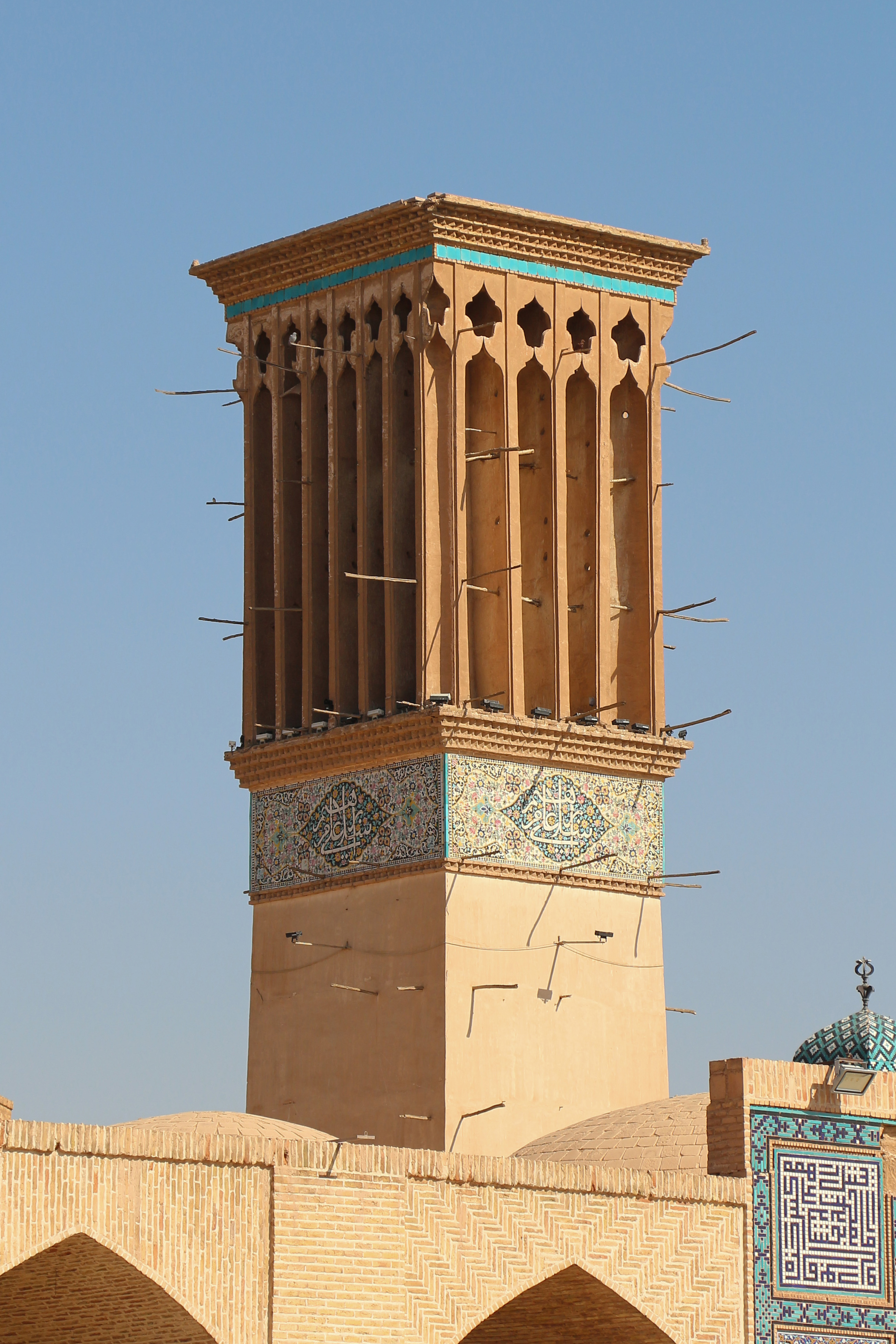
Windcatcher at Ganjali Khan Complex, Kerman

External videos
- Iranian city uses ancient techniques to defy summer heat - AFP . Iranian city uses ancient techniques to defy summer heat - AFP

Rising temperatures and heatwaves are key risks for cities. With warmer temperatures the urban heat island effect is likely to get worse. Population growth and land use change will influence human health and productivity risks in cities. Urban flooding is another key risk. This is especially the case in coastal settlements where flood risks are exacerbated by sea-level rise and storm surges. A further set of risks arises from reduced water availability. When supply cannot meet demand from expanding settlements, urban residents become exposed to water insecurity and climate impacts. This is especially so during periods of lower rainfall. These key risks differ greatly between cities, and between different groups of people in the same city.

Adaptation options for cities include flood control measures within and outside properties and urban drainage projects. Other examples are nature-based solutions such as bioswales or other vegetated infrastructure and restoration and/or protection of mangroves along coastlines. Vegetation corridors, greenspace, wetlands and other green infrastructure can also reduce heat risks. Building designs such as installing air conditioning, 'cool roofs' with high-reflectance materials or solar chimneys can also help. Several institutional adaptations are particularly important for cities, for example legislation of building codes, zoning and land use measures.

Many cities have integrated city-wide adaptation strategies or plans that bring together social and economic activities, civil authorities and infrastructure services. Such actions are more effective if they are implemented in partnership with local communities, national governments, research institutions, and the private and third sector.

=== Water ===
Climate change is affecting the overall and seasonal availability of water across regions. Climate change is projected to increase the variability of rain. There will be impacts on water quality as well as quantity. Floods can wash pollutants into water bodies and damage water infrastructure. In many places, particularly in the tropics and sub-tropics, there are longer dry spells and droughts, sometimes over consecutive years. These have contributed to drier soil conditions, lower groundwater tables and reduced or changed flows of rivers. There are risks to ecosystems, and across many water-using sectors of the economy. Agriculture is likely to be affected by changes in water availability, putting food security at risk. Irrigation has often contributed to groundwater depletion and changes in the water cycle. It can sometimes make a drought worse.

Some of the most popular adaptations in agriculture include choosing less water-intensive crops or drought and flood-resistant varieties. They include shifting the timing of sowing and harvesting according to the start of the rainy season. There are other technological options available for saving water. Water is used for hydroelectric generation, for cooling of power plants, and in other industries such as mining. Adapting hydroelectric plant designs and control systems to operate with less water or diversifying in energy generation with other renewables are effective options.

=== Livelihoods and communities ===
Climate change affects livelihoods and living conditions in significant ways. These include access to natural resources and ecosystems, land and other assets. Access to basic infrastructure services such as water and sanitation, electricity, roads, telecommunications is another aspect of vulnerability of communities and livelihoods to climate change.

The biggest livelihood-related risks stem from losses of agricultural yields, impacts on human health and food security, destruction of homes, and loss of income. There are also risks to fish and livestock that livelihoods depend on. Some communities and livelihoods also face risks of irreversible losses and challenges to development, as well as more complex disaster risks.

The consequences of climate change are the most severe for the poorest populations. These are disproportionately more exposed to hazards such as temperature extremes and droughts. They usually have fewer resources and assets and less access to funding, support and political influence. There are other forms of disadvantage due to discrimination, gender inequalities and through lack of access to resources This includes people with disabilities or minority groups.

Across livelihoods sectors for households and communities the most common adaptation responses are engineered and technological options. These include traditional infrastructure to protect a specific land use, ecosystem approaches such as watershed restoration or climate-smart agriculture technologies. Adaptation requires public and private investment in various natural assets. It also requires institutions that prioritize the needs of communities, including the poorest.

=== International impacts and cascading risk ===
International climate risks are climate risks that cross national borders. Sometimes the impacts of climate change in one country or region can have further consequences for people in other countries. Risks can spread from one country to a neighbouring country, or from one country to distant regions. Risks can also cascade and have knock-on effects elsewhere, across multiple borders and sectors. For example, an impact of the floods in Thailand in 2011 was disruption to manufacturing supply chains affecting the automotive sector and electronics industry in Japan, Europe and the USA.

Options for adapting are less developed. They include developing resilient infrastructure in the originating country, increasing storage facilities to allow more buffer in the recipient country, or diversifying and re-routing trade. To manage increasing urban flood risks and extreme heat, many municipalities are adopting nature-based urban designs such as the "sponge city" concept, which uses permeable pavements, rain gardens, and restored wetlands to absorb excess stormwater and replenish groundwater. Additionally, urban heat island effects are increasingly mitigated through cool roofs, reflective surfaces, and expanded urban tree canopies, which lower ambient temperatures and reduce energy demand during heatwaves.

== Costs and finance ==
=== Economic costs ===
The economic costs of adaptation to climate change will depend on how much the climate changes. Higher levels of warming lead to considerably higher costs. Globally, adaptation is likely to cost tens or hundreds of billions of dollars annually for the next several decades. The IPCC's most recent summary states that adaptation will cost $15 to 411 billion per year for climate change impacts to 2030. Most estimates are well above $100 billion." Because these costs are much higher than the finance available, there is an adaptation gap. This is especially pressing in developing countries. This gap is wideningand forms a major barrier to adaptation. This widening has become apparent because the overwhelming majority of global tracked climate finance goes to mitigation. Only a small proportion goes on adaptation.

More regional estimates are also available. For example, the Asian Development Bank has a series of studies on the Economics of Climate Change in the Asia-Pacific region. These studies provide cost analysis of both adaptation and mitigation measures. The WEAP (Water Evaluation And Planning system) assists water resources researchers and planners in assessing impacts of and adaptations to climate change. The United Nations Development Programme's Climate Change Adaptation Portal includes studies on climate change adaptation in Africa, Europe and Central Asia, and Asia and the Pacific.

According to a survey conducted in the European Union, 15% of respondents believe that wealthier individuals should bear the costs of climate change adaptations through higher taxes. The same survey revealed that over a third (35%) of respondents believe that the expenses should be covered by the companies and industries that contribute most to climate change.

=== Cost benefit analysis ===
As of 2007 there was still a lack of comprehensive, global cost and benefit estimates for adaptation. Since then, an extensive research literature has emerged. Studies generally focus on adaptation in developing countries or within a sector. For many adaptation options in specific contexts, the investment will be lower than the avoided damages. But global estimates have considerable uncertainty.

=== International finance ===
The United Nations Framework Convention on Climate Change incorporates a financial mechanism to developing country parties to support them with adaptation. This is in Article 11 of the convention. Until 2009, three funds existed under the UNFCCC financial mechanism. The Global Environmental Facility administers the Special Climate Change Fund (SCCF) and the Least Developed Countries Fund (LDCF). The Adaptation Fund resulted from negotiations during COP15 and COP16 in 2009 and 2010. It has its own Secretariat. Initially, when the Kyoto Protocol was in operation, the Adaptation Fund was financed by a 2% levy on the Clean Development Mechanism (CDM).

At the 2009 Copenhagen Summit, nations committed to the goal of sending $100 billion per year to developing countries for climate change mitigation and adaptation by 2020. The Green Climate Fund was created in 2010 as one of the channels for mobilizing this climate finance. The 2015 Paris conference, COP21, clarified that the $100 billion per year should involve a balanced split between mitigation and adaptation. As of December 2020, the promised $100 billion per year had not been fully delivered. Most developing country finance was still targeted towards mitigation. Adaptation received only 21% of the public finance provided in 2020.

Global adaptation financing from multilateral development banks exceeded €19 billion in 2021. This implies a rising trend in the financing of adaptation. Multilateral banks made a commitment to increase adaptation financing in a joint declaration on climate change at COP27. This particularly targets low-income nations, small island developing states, and underprivileged people. The European Investment Bank has said that it will raise the share it contributes to 75% for projects focusing on climate adaptation. The bank usually contributes up to 50% to a project it participates in.

Also in 2022, nations agreed on a proposal to establish a loss and damage fund to support communities in averting, minimizing, and addressing damages and risks where adaptation is not enough or comes too late.

The Adaptation Gap Report November 2023, published by the United Nations Environment Programme (UNEP), reveals an adaptation finance gap of $194 billion to $366 billion annually. The adaptation needs in developing countries are estimated to range from $215 billion to $387 billion per year, which is 10-18 times the current international public finance flows for adaptation. The report also notes a 15% decline in international public climate finance to developing countries, down to $21.3 billion in 2021. The urgency to increase adaptation finance is highlighted, with an average annual increase of at least 16% required from 2022 to 2026 to align with COP 26 commitments.

=== Additionality ===
A key feature of international adaptation finance is the concept of additionality. This reflects the linkages between adaptation finance and other levels of development aid. Many developed countries already provide international aid assistance to developing countries. This addresses challenges such as poverty, malnutrition, food insecurity, availability of drinking water, indebtedness, illiteracy, unemployment, local resource conflicts, and lower technological development. Climate change threatens to exacerbate or stall progress on fixing some of these problems, and creates new ones. Additionality refers to the extra costs of adaptation to avoid existing aid being redirected.

The four main definitions of additionality are:

1. Climate finance classified as aid, but additional to the Millennium Development Goals;
2. Increase on previous year's Official Development Assistance (ODA) spent on climate change mitigation;
3. Rising ODA levels that include climate change finance but where it is limited to a specified percentage; and
4. Increase in climate finance not connected to ODA.

A criticism of additionality is that it encourages business as usual. This is because it does not account for the future risks of climate change. Some advocates have proposed integrating climate change adaptation into poverty reduction programs.

From 2010 to 2020, Denmark increased its global warming adaptation aid by one third, from 0.09% of GDP to 0.12% of GDP. But this did not involve additional funds. Instead, the aid was taken from other foreign assistance funds. Politiken wrote: "Climate assistance is taken from the poorest."

== Challenges ==
=== Differing time scales ===
Adaptation can occur in anticipation of change or be a response to those changes. For example, artificial snow-making in the European Alps responds to current climate trends. The construction of the Confederation Bridge in Canada at a higher elevation takes into account the effect of future sea-level rise on ship clearance under the bridge.

Effective adaptive policy can be difficult to implement because policymakers are rewarded more for enacting short-term change, rather than long-term planning. Since the impacts of climate change are generally not seen in the short term, policymakers have less incentive to act. Furthermore, climate change is occurring on a global scale. This requires a global framework for adapting to and combating climate change. The vast majority of climate change adaptation and mitigation policies are being implemented on a more local scale. This is because different regions must adapt differently. National and global policies are often more challenging to enact.

=== Maladaptation ===
In climate change mitigation maladaptation describes an adaptation action that results in directly increasing vulnerability to climate change and/or a decreasing overall capacity to take sustainable adaptations in the future. The term maladaptation was first introduced by the IPCC in 2001. The IPCC explains maladaptation as follows: "actions that may lead to increased risk of adverse climate-related outcomes, including via increased greenhouse gas emissions, increased or shifted vulnerability to climate change, more inequitable outcomes, or diminished welfare, now or in the future. Most often, maladaptation is an unintended consequence."

Much adaptation takes place in relation to short-term climate variability. But this may cause maladaptation to longer-term climate trends. The expansion of irrigation in Egypt into the Western Sinai desert after a period of higher river flows is maladaptation given the longer-term projections of drying in the region. Adaptations at one scale can have impacts at another by reducing the adaptive capacity of other people or organizations. This is often the case when broad assessments of the costs and benefits of adaptation are examined at smaller scales. An adaptation may benefit some people, but have a negative effect on others. Development interventions to increase adaptive capacity have tended not to result in increased power or agency for local people. Agency is a central factor in all other aspects of adaptive capacity and so planners need to pay more attention to this factor.

In general, "community-driven bottom-up adaptation" approaches have lower risks for maladaptation than top-down technical fixes if they do not follow a holistic approach. The installation of seawalls, for example, can create problems with waterlogged fields and loss of soil fertility.

The growing use of fertilizers and pesticides is an example of maladaptation. They generate additional greenhouse gases during their production which contributes to a decrease in crop yields. The use of air-conditioning is another example. If the electricity used is based on carbon intensive energy then the extra greenhouse gases produced only add to the problem.

=== Limits to adaptation ===
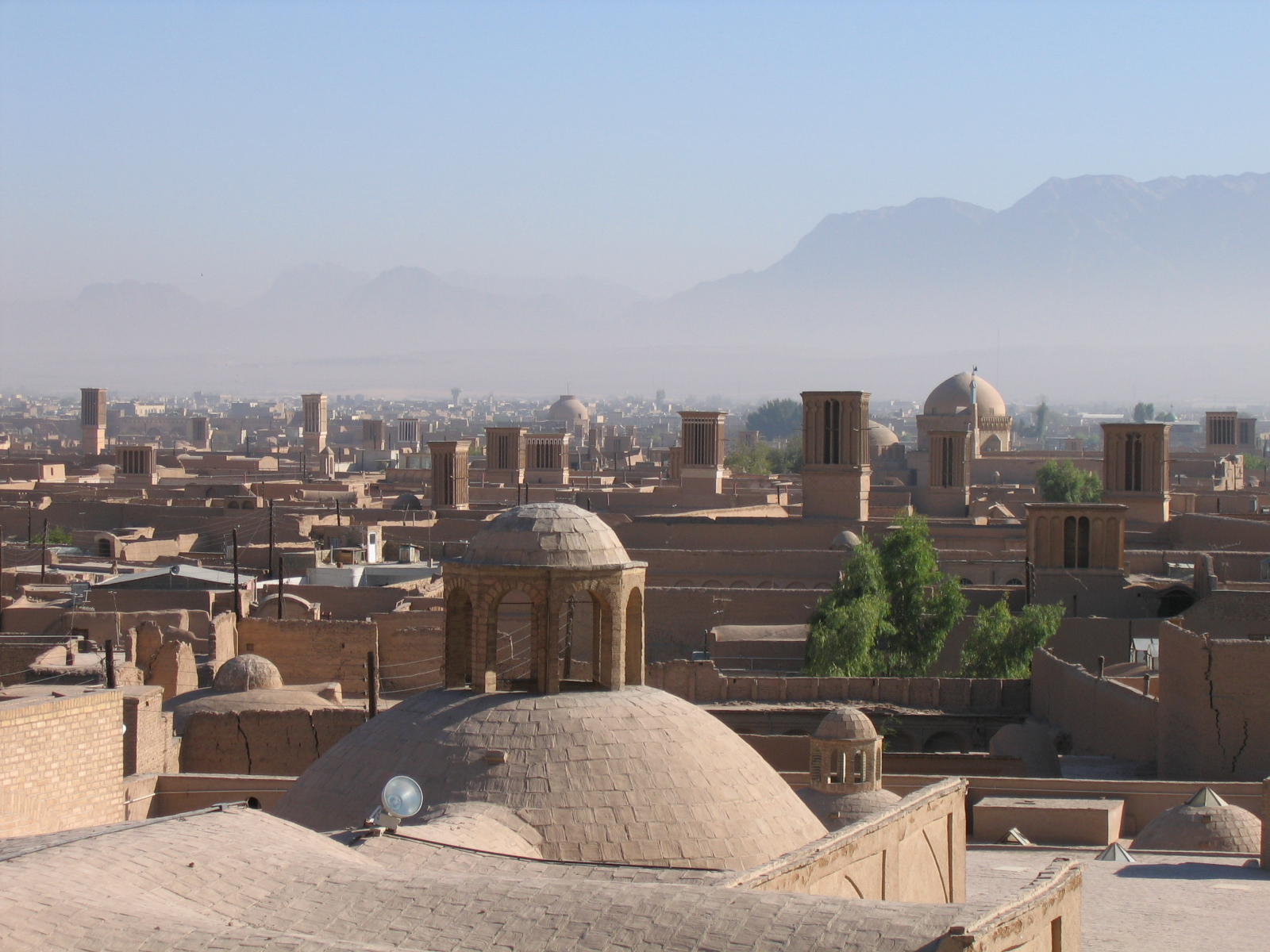
Wind towers and domes form part of the skyline of Yazd

People have always adapted to climate change. Some community coping strategies already exist. Examples include changing sowing times or adopting new water-saving techniques. Traditional knowledge and coping strategies must be maintained and strengthened. If not there is a risk of weakening adaptive capacity as local knowledge of the environment is lost. Strengthening these local techniques and building upon them also makes the adoption of adaptation strategies more likely. This is because it creates more community ownership and involvement in the process. In many cases this will not be enough to adapt to new conditions. These may be outside the range of those previously experienced, and new techniques will be necessary.

The incremental adaptations become insufficient as the vulnerabilities and risks of climate change increase. This creates a need for transformational adaptations which are much larger and costlier. Current development efforts increasingly focus on community-based climate change adaptation. They seek to enhance local knowledge, participation and ownership of adaptation strategies.

The IPCC Sixth Assessment Report in 2022 put considerable emphasis on adaptation limits. It makes a distinction between soft and hard adaptation limits. The report stated that some human and natural systems already reached "soft adaptation limits" including human systems in Australia, Small Islands, America, Africa and Europe and some natural systems reach even the "hard adaptation limits" like part of corals, wetland, rainforests, ecosystems in polar and mountain regions. If the temperature rise will reach 1.5 °C (34.7 °F) additional ecosystems and human systems will reach hard adaptation limits, including regions depending on glaciers and snow water and small islands. At 2 °C (36 °F) temperature rise, soft limits will be reached by many staple crops in many areas while at 3 °C (37 °F) hard limits will be reached by parts of Europe.

=== Incentivizing private investment in adaptation ===
Climate change adaptation is a much more complex investment area than mitigation. This is mainly because of the lack of a well-defined income stream or business case with an attractive return on investment on projects. There are several specific challenges for private investment:

- Adaptation is often needed in non-market sectors or is focused on public goods that benefit many. So there is a shortage of projects that are attractive to the private sector;
- There is a mismatch between the timing of investments needed in the short term and the benefits that may occur in the medium or long term. Future returns are less attractive to investors than short-term returns;
- There is a lack of information about investment opportunities. This especially concerns uncertainties associated with future impacts and benefits. These are key considerations when returns may accrue over longer timeframes;
- There are gaps in human resources and capacities to design adaptation projects and understand financial implications of legal, economic and regulatory frameworks.

However, there is considerable innovation in this area. This is increasing the potential for private sector finance to play a larger role in closing the adaptation finance gap. Economists state that climate adaptation initiatives should be an urgent priority for business investment.

=== Trade-offs with mitigation ===
Trade-offs between adaptation and mitigation may occur when climate-relevant actions point in different directions. For instance, compact urban development may lead to reduced greenhouse gas emissions from transport and building. On the other hand, it may increase the urban heat island effect, leading to higher temperatures and increasing exposure, making adaptation more challenging.

== Planning and monitoring of implementation ==
Climate adaptation planning aims to manage the level of risks of negative impacts. Adaptation planning is similar to risk management. It is a continuing process of assessment, action, learning and adjustment, rather than a single set of decisions. In this way planning and implementing adaptation are both closely connected.

Adaptation planning is an activity. But it is also associated with a type of adaptation. Planned adaptation is sometimes distinguished from autonomous adaptation.

Another important concept in adaptation planning is mainstreaming. Mainstreaming means integrating climate change into established strategies, policies or plans. This can be more efficient than developing separate climate adaptation activities and is more likely to succeed. It can also be more sustainable. It involves changing the mindsets and practices of policymakers to bring in new issues and have them widely accepted.

A key entry point for this type of integration is national development planning. It needs to take into account new and existing national policies, sectoral policies and budgets. Similarly, mainstreaming adaptation in cities should consider existing city plans, such as land use planning. There approach also has shortcomings. One criticism is that it has reduced the visibility of stand-alone adaptation programmes.

Adaptation planning usually draws on assessments of risks and vulnerability to climate change. It evaluates the relative benefits and costs of different measures to reduce these risks. Following planning, the next stage is implementation. Guidance has been developed that outline these general stages of an adaptation process, such as the EU Adaptation Support Tool.

1. Preparing the ground for adaptation
2. Assessing climate change risks and vulnerabilities
3. Identifying adaptation options
4. Assessing adaptation options
5. Implementing adaptation
6. Monitoring and evaluating adaptation

As of 2022, adaptation efforts have focused more on adaptation planning than on implementation. All regions and sectors have made progress. However, the gaps between current needs and current implementation continues to grow.

Monitoring and evaluation of adaptation is crucial to ensure that adaptation action is proceeding as planned. It also provide lessons to improve them and understand which additional actions are necessary. Development and use of monitoring and evaluation systems is increasing at national and local levels. As of 2020, around a quarter of countries had a monitoring and evaluation framework in place. Recent international adaptation strategies increasingly emphasize locally-led adaptation (LLA), which shifts decision-making power and direct financial access to local communities, municipal authorities, and Indigenous peoples rather than relying solely on top-down national planning. Integrating Indigenous and traditional ecological knowledge into ecosystem-based adaptation has been recognized as vital for enhancing biodiversity conservation and sustainable resource management in vulnerable regions.

=== By country and city ===
National governments typically have the key role in setting policies, planning, coordinating and distributing finance for climate adaptation. They are also accountable to the international community through international agreements. Many countries document their adaptation plans in their NDCs submitted under the Paris Agreement and/or national adaptation plans. Developing countries can receive support with international funding to help them develop their national adaptation plans.

As of 2020, 72% of countries had a high level adaptation instrument – such as a plan, policy or strategy. Relatively few had progressed to the tangible implementation of projects: at least not to significantly reduce the climate risk their populations are exposed to.

Countries have also made progress in developing plans for subnational government authorities. These include county/provincial level, sectors and city plans. In 2020, around 21% of countries had sub-national plans and 58% had sectoral plans.

As of 2022, there is better integration of adaptation priorities into other national plans and planning systems. Planning is also more inclusive. This means that climate laws and policies increasingly reference different groups such as persons with disabilities, children, young people and future generations.

Many cities have integrated city-wide adaptation strategies or plans that bring together their social and economic activities, civil authorities and infrastructure services. A survey of 812 global cities found that 93% reported they are at risk from climate change, 43% did not have an adaptation plan in 2021, and 41% of cities had not carried out a climate risk and vulnerability assessment.

=== Global goals ===
Sustainable Development Goal 13 aims to strengthen countries' resilience and adaptive capacities to climate-related issues. This adjustment includes many areas such as infrastructure, agriculture and education. The Paris Agreement includes several provisions for adaptation. It seeks to promote the idea of global responsibility, improve communication via the adaptation component of the Nationally Determined Contributions, and includes an agreement that developed countries should provide some financial support and technology transfer to promote adaptation in more vulnerable countries.

The United Nations estimates Africa would need yearly funding of $1.3 trillion to achieve the Sustainable Development Goals in the region, considering population growth. The International Monetary Fund also estimates that $50 billion may be needed only to cover the expenses of climate adaptation.

== History ==
When climate change first became prominent on the international political agenda in the early 1990s, talk of adaptation was considered an unwelcome distraction from the need to reach agreement on effective measures for mitigation – which has mainly meant reducing the emissions of greenhouse gases. A few voices had spoken out in favour of adaptation even in the late 20th and early 21st century. In 2009 and 2010, adaptation began to receive more attention during international climate negotiations. This was after limited progress at the Copenhagen Summit had made it clear that achieving international consensus for emission reductions would be more challenging than had been hoped. In 2009, the rich nations of the world committed to providing a total of $100 billion per year to help developing nations fund their climate adaptation projects. This commitment was underscored at the 2010 Cancún Summit, and again at the 2015 Paris Conference. The promise was not fulfilled, but the amount of funding provided by the rich nations for adaptations did increase over the 2010 – 2020 period.

Climate change adaptation has tended to be more of a focus for local authorities, while national and international politics has tended to focus on mitigation. There have been exceptions – in countries that feel especially exposed to the effects of climate change, sometimes the focus has been more on adaptation even at national level.

== See also ==
- Adaptation in Africa
- Green bond
- Climate change adaptation strategies on the German coast
- Climate finance
- Climate justice
- Climate Vulnerability Monitor
