= Climate-smart agriculture =

System for agricultural productivity

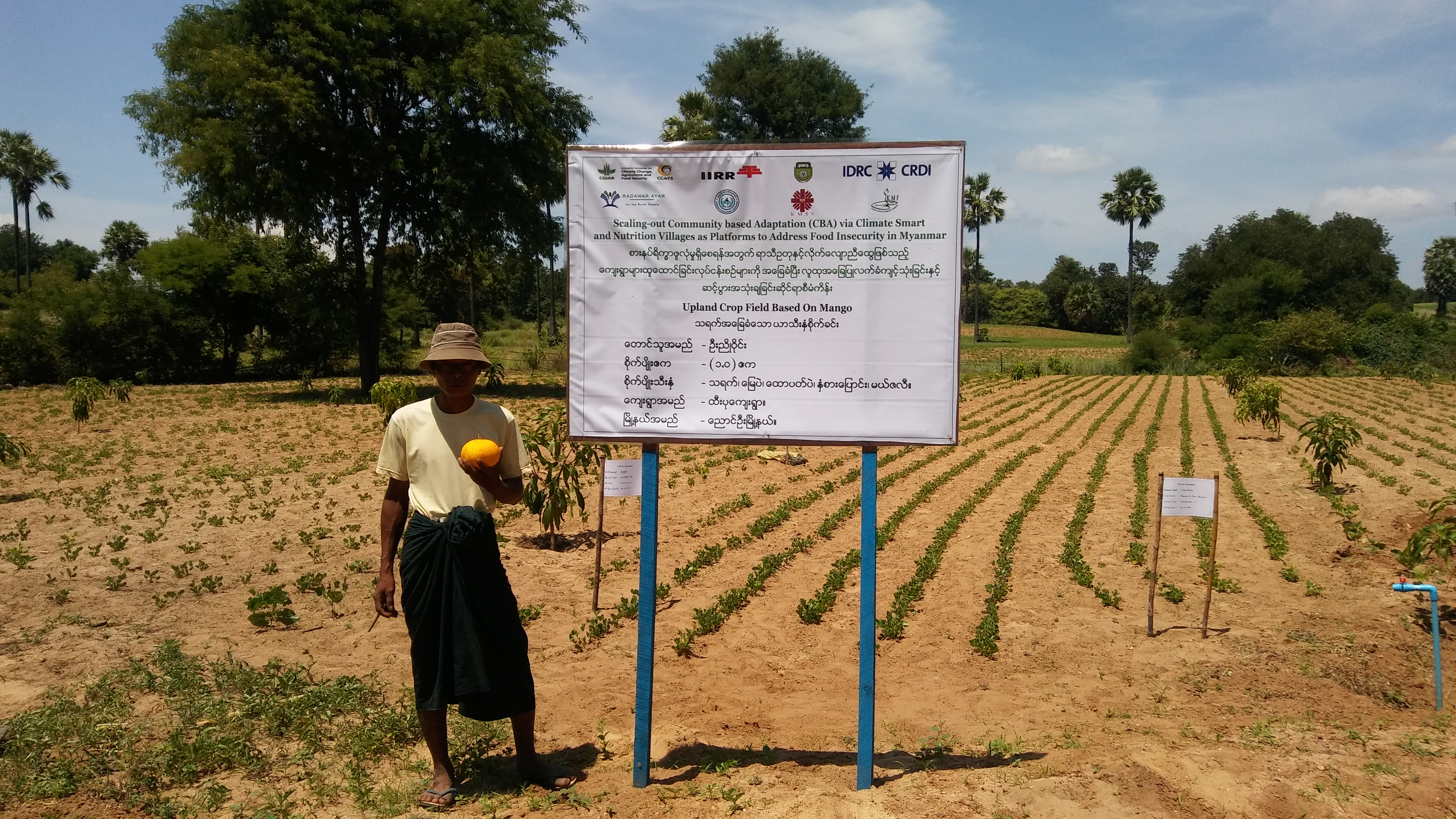
A local farmer in Myanmar poses in front of a mango field that is a part of a Climate Smart Village.

Climate-smart agriculture (CSA), or climate resilient agriculture, is a set of farming methods that has three main objectives with regard to climate change. First, they use adaptation methods to respond to the effects of climate change on agriculture (this also builds resilience to climate change). Second, they aim to increase agricultural productivity and to ensure food security for a growing world population. Third, they try to reduce greenhouse gas emissions from agriculture as much as possible (e.g., by following carbon farming approaches). Climate-smart agriculture works as an integrated approach to managing land. This approach helps farmers to adapt their agricultural methods (for raising livestock and crops) to the effects of climate change.

CSA can assist in the research of the introduction of new crop varieties to address the changing climate. CSA can include the planting of heat tolerant crop varieties, mulching, boundary trees, and appropriate housing and spacing for cattle.

The term climate-smart agriculture has been criticized as a form of greenwashing for big businesses.

== Definition ==
The World Bank Group described climate-smart agriculture (CSA) as follows: "CSA is a set of agricultural practices and technologies which simultaneously boost productivity, enhance resilience and reduce GHG emissions." Also, "CSA is an integrated approach to managing landscapes—cropland, livestock, forests and fisheries--that address the interlinked challenges of food security and climate change."

The Food and Agriculture Organization (FAO) says CSA "is not a new set of sustainability practices or production systems, but an approach that involves different elements embedded in local contexts. It provides the means for integrating the specificities of adaptation and mitigation into sustainable agricultural development policies, programmes and investments."

== Objectives ==
According to the FAO, CSA's main objectives "simultaneously [address] food security and climate change, while contributing to greenhouse gas mitigation".

Others describe the objectives as follows: mitigate the adverse impacts of climate change on agriculture, stabilize crop production, and maximize food security.

=== Increasing climate resilience ===
Climate change is altering global rainfall patterns. This affects agriculture. Rainfed agriculture accounts for 80% of global agriculture. Many of the 852 million poor people in the world live in parts of Asia and Africa that depend on rainfall to cultivate food crops. Climate change will modify rainfall, evaporation, runoff, and soil moisture storage. Extended drought can cause the failure of small and marginal farms. This results in increased economic, political, and social disruption.

Water availability, including changes in total seasonal precipitation or its pattern of variability, influences agriculture. Moisture stress during flowering, pollination, and grain-filling harms most crops. It is particularly harmful to corn, soybeans, and wheat. Increased evaporation from the soil and accelerated transpiration in the plants themselves will cause moisture stress.

There are many adaptation options. One is to develop crop varieties with greater drought tolerance and another is to build local rainwater storage. Using small planting basins to harvest water in Zimbabwe has boosted maize yields. This happens whether rainfall is abundant or scarce. In Niger, they have led to three or fourfold increases in millet yields.

Digital technologies allow farmers to adapt to changing rainfall patterns through remote sensing of soil moisture, IoT-based irrigation control, and data analytics for rainfall forecasting.

Climate change can threaten food security and water security. It is possible to adapt food systems to improve food security and prevent negative impacts from climate change in the future.

=== Reducing greenhouse gas emissions ===
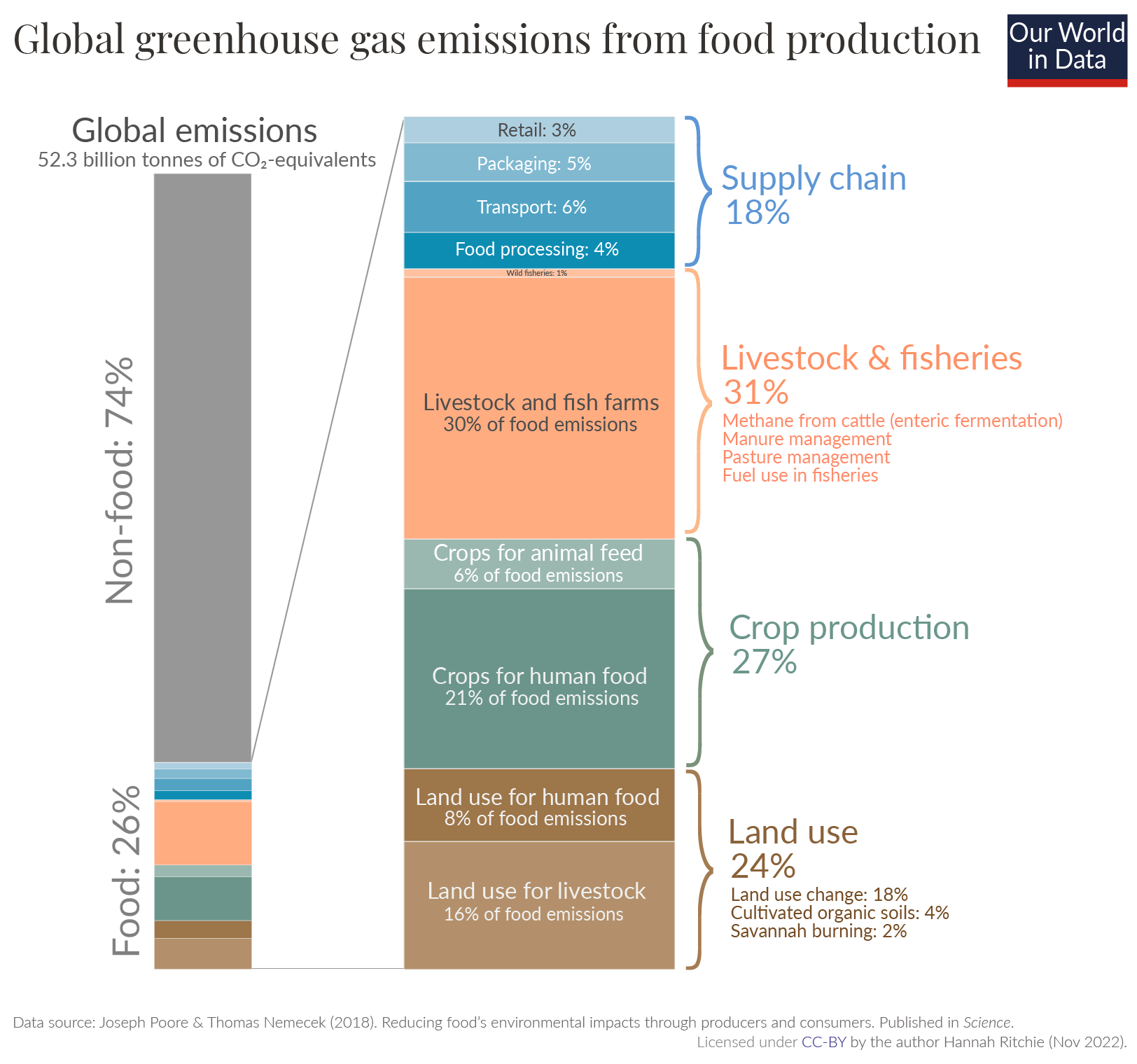
One quarter of the world's greenhouse gas emissions result from food and agriculture (data from 2019).

Greenhouse gas emissions from the agriculture, forestry, and land use sectors contribute 13%–21% of global GHG emissions. Direct GHG emissions include those from rice and livestock farming. Indirect emissions from the conversion of non-agricultural land such as forests into agricultural land are also important. With regard to direct emissions, nitrous oxide and methane makeup over half of total GHG emissions from agriculture.

There is also fossil fuel consumption for transport and fertilizer production. For example, the manufacture and use of nitrogen fertilizer contributes around 5% of all global greenhouse gas emissions.

Ruminant cattle for beef and dairy rank high in GHG emissions. In comparison, monogastric, or pigs and poultry-related foods, are lower. The consumption of the monogastric types may yield less emissions. Monogastric animals have a higher feed-conversion efficiency and also do not produce as much methane. Non-ruminant livestock, such as poultry, emit much less greenhouse gas.

Mitigation measures in the food system can be divided into four categories: demand-side changes, ecosystem protections, mitigation on farms, and mitigation in supply chains. On the demand side, limiting food waste is an effective way to reduce food emissions. Changes to a diet less reliant on animal products such as plant-based diets are also effective. This could include milk substitutes and meat alternatives. Several methods are also under investigation to reduce the GHG emissions from livestock farming. These include genetic selection, introduction of methanotrophic bacteria into the rumen, vaccines, feeds, diet modification, and grazing management.

== Strategies ==
Strategies and methods for CSA should be specific to the local contexts where they are employed. They should include capacity-building for participants in order to offset the higher costs of implementation.

=== Carbon farming ===
Carbon farming is one of the components of CSA and aims at reducing or removing greenhouse gas emissions from agriculture.

Carbon farming is a set of agricultural methods that aim to store carbon in the soil and biomass. The technical term for this is carbon sequestration. The overall goal of carbon farming is to create a net loss of carbon from the atmosphere. This is done by increasing the rate at which carbon is sequestered into soil and plant material. The increase of biomass from roots and the soil's microbiome leads to an increase in the organic matter content of the soil. Increasing organic matter content in soils aids plant growth, improves soil water retention capacity and reduces fertilizer use. Sustainable forest management is another tool that is used in carbon farming. Carbon farming is one component of climate-smart agriculture. It is also one way to remove carbon dioxide from the atmosphere.

Agricultural methods for carbon farming include adjusting how tillage and livestock grazing is done, using organic mulch or compost, working with biochar and terra preta, and changing the crop types. Methods used in forestry include reforestation and bamboo farming. As of 2016, variants of carbon farming reached hundreds of millions of hectares globally, of the nearly 5 billion hectares (1.2×10^{10} acres) of world farmland.

=== Gender-responsive approach ===
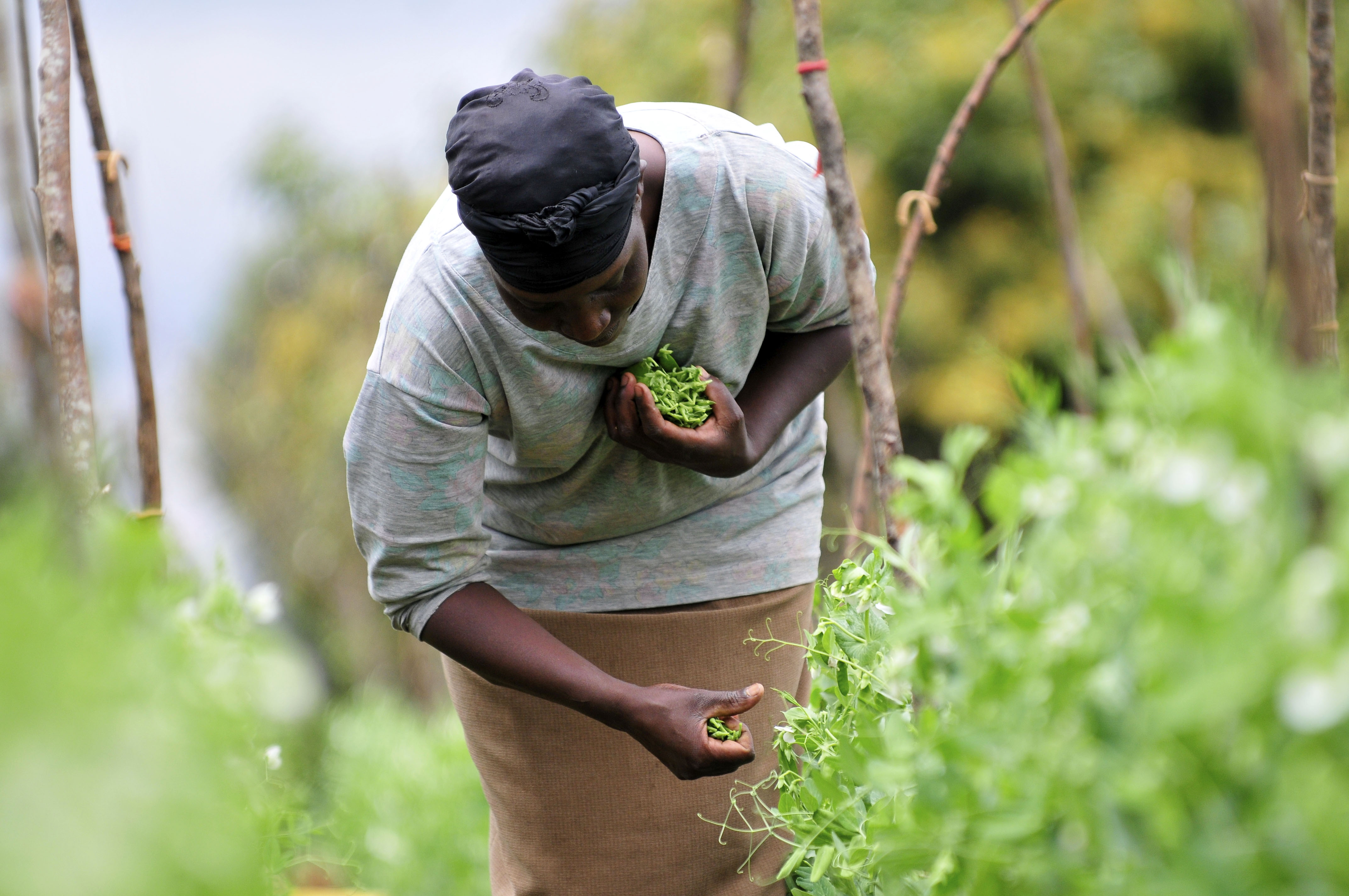
Woman picking peas in the Mount Kenya region, for the Two Degrees Up project, to look at the effects of climate change on agriculture

To increase the effectiveness and sustainability of CSA interventions, they must be designed to address gender inequalities and discriminations against people at risk. Women farmers are more prone to climate risk than men are because, in developing countries, women have less access compared to men to productive resources, financial capital, and advisory services. They often tend to be excluded from decision making, which may impact on their adoption of technologies and practices that could help them adapt to climatic conditions. A gender-responsive approach to CSA tries to identify and address the diverse constraints faced by men and women and recognizes their specific capabilities.

Climate-smart agriculture presents opportunities for women in agriculture to engage in sustainable production.

== Monitoring tools ==
The FAO has identified several tools for countries and individuals to assess, monitor, and evaluate integral parts of CSA planning and implementation:

1. Modelling System for Agricultural Impacts of Climate Change (MOSAICC)
2. Global Livestock Environmental Assessment Model (GLEAM)
3. Sustainability Assessment of Food and Agriculture (SAFA) system
4. Economics and Policy Innovations for Climate-Smart Agriculture (EPIC)
5. Ex-Ante Carbon-balance Tool (EX-ACT)
6. Climate Risk Management (CRM)
7. Gender mainstreaming
8. Monitoring and Assessment of Greenhouse Gas Emissions and Mitigation Potential in Agriculture (MAGHG) project

== Climate-Resilient Agriculture Index ==
The Climate-Resilient Agriculture (CRA) Index is a tool designed to assess and improve the resilience of agricultural systems to climate change. Two distinct versions of this index exist, each with a unique purpose and scope:

=== CRA Index ===
The CRA Index is aimed at benchmarking national agricultural resilience across countries. It uses nine indicators grouped into three dimensions: agricultural productivity and resource use efficiency, environmental sustainability and climate impact, and socio-economic resilience. It helps categorise nations into four resilience levels: Highly Resilient, Moderately Resilient, Low Resilience, and Very Low Resilience. This index provides policymakers with insights to prioritise interventions and enhance national-level climate adaptation strategies.

=== CRA Index for India ===
The CRA Index for India evaluates climate resilience within the country's diverse agro-climatic zones. It employs 26 indicators spanning environmental, technological, socio-economic, and infrastructural dimensions to assess inter- and intra-zone resilience variations. This region-specific framework supports the development of tailored strategies to address local challenges and improve agricultural adaptability to climate change.

Both indices offer valuable insights for addressing the impacts of climate change on agriculture. While the global CRA Index focuses on international benchmarking and national-level strategies, the CRA Index for India targets regional disparities to guide localised interventions.

== Major initiatives ==
=== European Green Deal ===
The European Union (EU) has promoted the development of climate-smart agriculture and forestry practices as part of the European Green Deal Policy. A critical assessment of progress was carried out using different multi-criteria indices covering socio-economic, technical, and environmental factors. The results indicated that the most advanced CSA countries within the EU were Austria, Denmark, and the Netherlands. The countries with the lowest levels of CSA penetration were Cyprus, Greece, and Portugal. Key factors included labor productivity, female ownership of farmland, level of education, degree of poverty and social exclusion, energy consumption/efficiency and biomass/crop productivity. The Horizon Europe research programme created a focus on CSA and climate-smart farming within the EU. Projects deal with co-creation among stakeholders to change behavior and understanding within agricultural value chains. Investigative CSA studies on pig, dairy, fruit, vegetable, and grain farms have been carried out in Denmark, Germany, Spain, Netherlands, and Lithuania, respectively.

=== Agriculture Innovation Mission for Climate ===
The Agriculture Innovation Mission for Climate (AIM for Climate/AIM4C) is a 5-year initiative to 2025, organized jointly by the United Nations, United States, and United Arab Emirates. The objective is to rally around CSA and food system innovations. It attracted some 500 government and non-government organizations around the world and about US$10 billion from governments and US$3 billion from other sources. The initiative was introduced during COP-26 in Glasgow.

The CGIAR, as part of the AIM4C summit in May 2023, called for a number of actions: integration of initiatives from partner organizations, enabling innovative financing, production of radical policy and governance reform based on evidence, and promotion of project monitoring, evaluation, and learning.

=== Global Roadmap to 2050 for Food and Agriculture ===
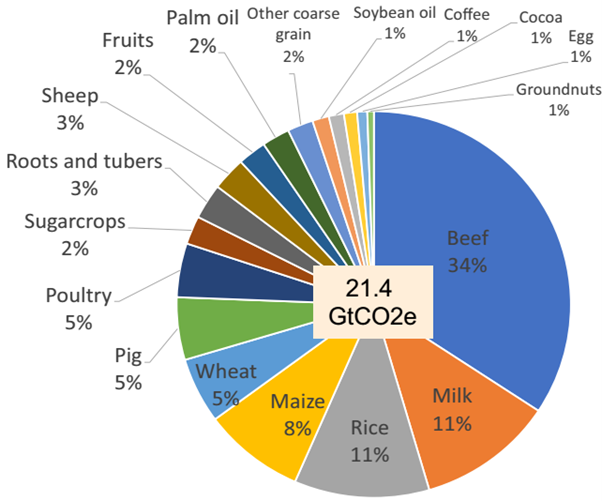
Global food systems GHG emissions in 2020 for different agriculture sectors in terms of gigatons of CO_{2} equivalents

Several actors are involved in creating pathways toward net-zero emissions in global food systems. The four areas of focus relate to:

- Lowered GHG-emission practices by increasing production efficiency
- Increased sequestration of carbon in croplands and grasslands
- Shifting of human diets away from livestock protein
- Taking on "new-horizon" technologies within food systems

Livestock production (beef, pork, chicken, sheep, and milk) alone accounts for almost 60% of total global food system GHG emissions. Rice, maize, and wheat stand for nearly 25% of the global emissions from food systems.

== Criticism ==
The greatest concern with CSA is that no universally accepted standard exists against which those who call themselves climate-smart are actually acting smart. Until those certifications are created and met, skeptics are concerned that big businesses will continue to use the name to greenwash their organizations—or provide a false sense of environmental stewardship. CSA can be seen as a meaningless label that is applicable to virtually anything, and this is deliberate as it is meant to conceal the social, political, and environmental implications of the different technology choices.

In 2014, The Guardian reported that climate-smart agriculture had been criticized as a form of greenwashing.

Contradictions surrounding practical value of CSA among consumers and suppliers may be the reason why the EU is lagging with CSA implementation compared to other areas of the world.

== See also ==
- Effects of climate change on agriculture
- Agroindustry
