= Climate Resilient Infrastructure Development Facility =

NGO in Southern Africa

The Climate Resilient Infrastructure Development Facility (CRIDF), which is working with 12 countries in Southern Africa,, is a £31 million program funded by the UK's Foreign, Commonwealth & Development Office. Its goal is to provide long-term solutions to water-related problems that impact and threaten the wellbeing of over 200 million people, many of whom are impoverished.

The Climate Resilient Infrastructure Development Facility (CRIDF) is a FCDO (Foreign, Commonwealth & Development Office) supported programme working to provide long-term solutions to water issues that affect poor communities in Southern Africa

For infrastructure projects that, once finished, would be owned and managed by national and local authorities, water/energy utilities, and beneficiary associations, CRIDF supports the in-country procurement, financing, and supervision mechanisms.

== History ==
CRIDF is a Department for International Development (DFID)'s new flagship water infrastructure programme for southern Africa. Over the next four years, the Facility aims to deliver sustainable smallscale infrastructure across 11 Southern African Development Community (SADC) region countries. Headquartered in Pretoria, South Africa, the demand-driven programme focuses on water services, water resource management, and agriculture, creating a lasting impact on the region's water, food and energy security

In addition to providing support with the design of irrigation schemes under the UNDP-GEF project for the livelihoods demonstration projects, the CRIDF has extended its support to the OKACOM-EU project by designing four hydrometric stations that will be erected in the basin.

== Works ==
The primary objective of CRIDF is to change the way water infrastructure is utilized to increase climate resilience for Southern Africans who are impoverished.

However, CRIDF facilitates:

- Integration and trade expansion leading to sustained and shared economic growth;
- Collaboration to manage scarce transboundary resources, to ensure sustainable development, build climate resilience and also to tackle issues of peace, sovereignty and security;
- Co-operation for dealing cost effectively with common issues facing the region – such as climate change.

Additionally, CRIDF offers qualifying organizations and projects a Rapid Advisory Service (RAS) that offers quick on-demand services.
