= Global Initiative for Food Security and Ecosystem Preservation =

Climate change organization

Global Initiative for Food Security and Preservation
- Formation: 2015
- Purpose: Climate Change, Adaptation Planning, Food Sovereignty, Biodiversity Conservation
- Headquarters: Abuja
- Location: Nigeria
- Fields: Climate Change Organization
- Website: gifsep4climate.org

The Global Initiative for Food Security and Ecosystem Preservation (GIFSEP) is a Nigerian organization founded on the ideals of Environmental Education, Climate Change Adaptation and Mitigation, Renewable Energy and sustainable development. GIFSEP, was established in recognition of the tremendous environmental challenges and the ever-increasing threats arising from the impacts of climate change. The organization’s thematic areas of operation include: Environment and Climate Change, Climate Smart Agriculture, Biodiversity conservation and Renewable Energy.

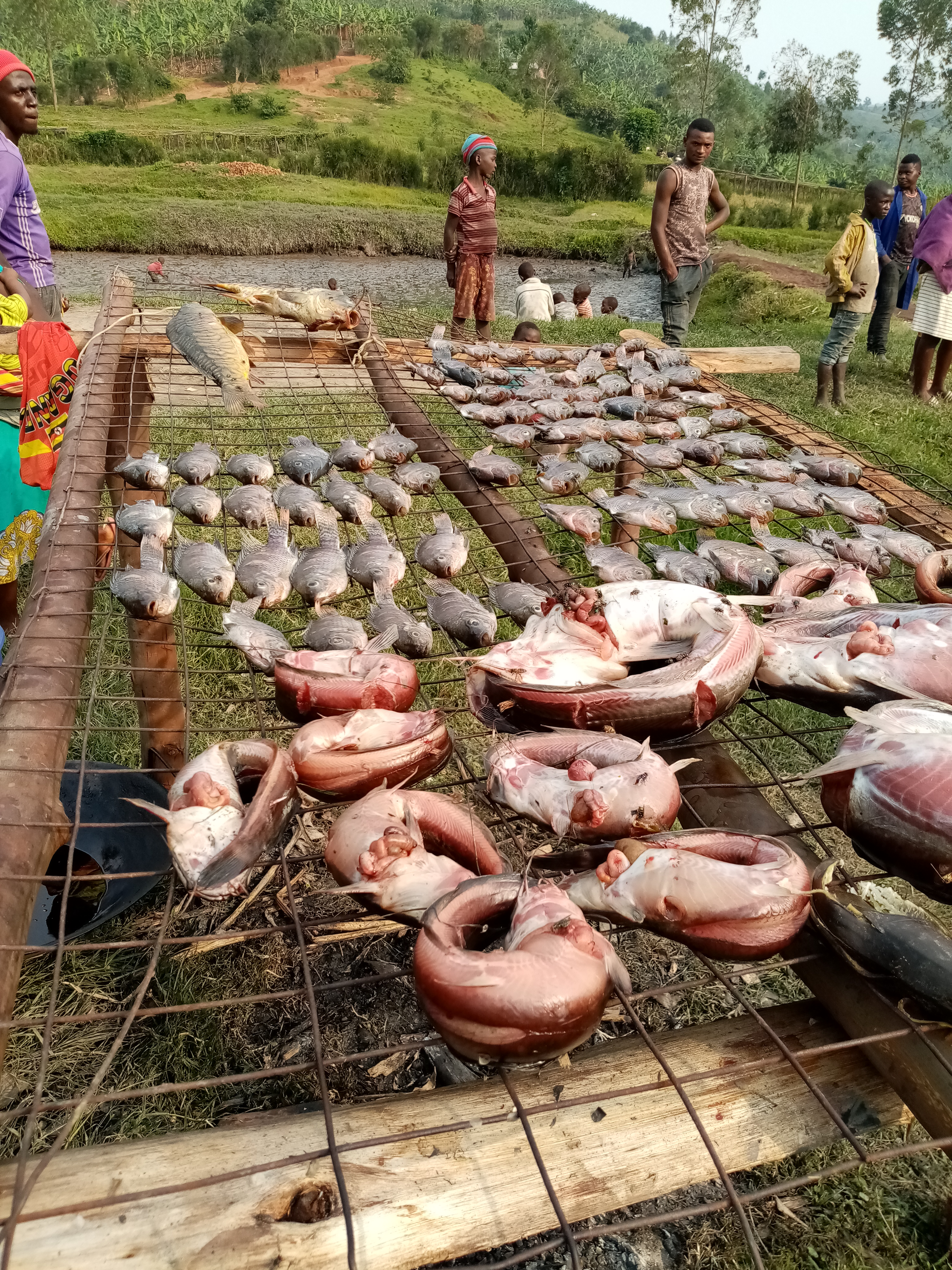
Fish preservation For future use in Isingiro District, Uganda

== Projects ==
Solar for Internally Displaced Persons Camp: Providing clean energy access to vulnerable populations in Internally Displaced Persons Camp.

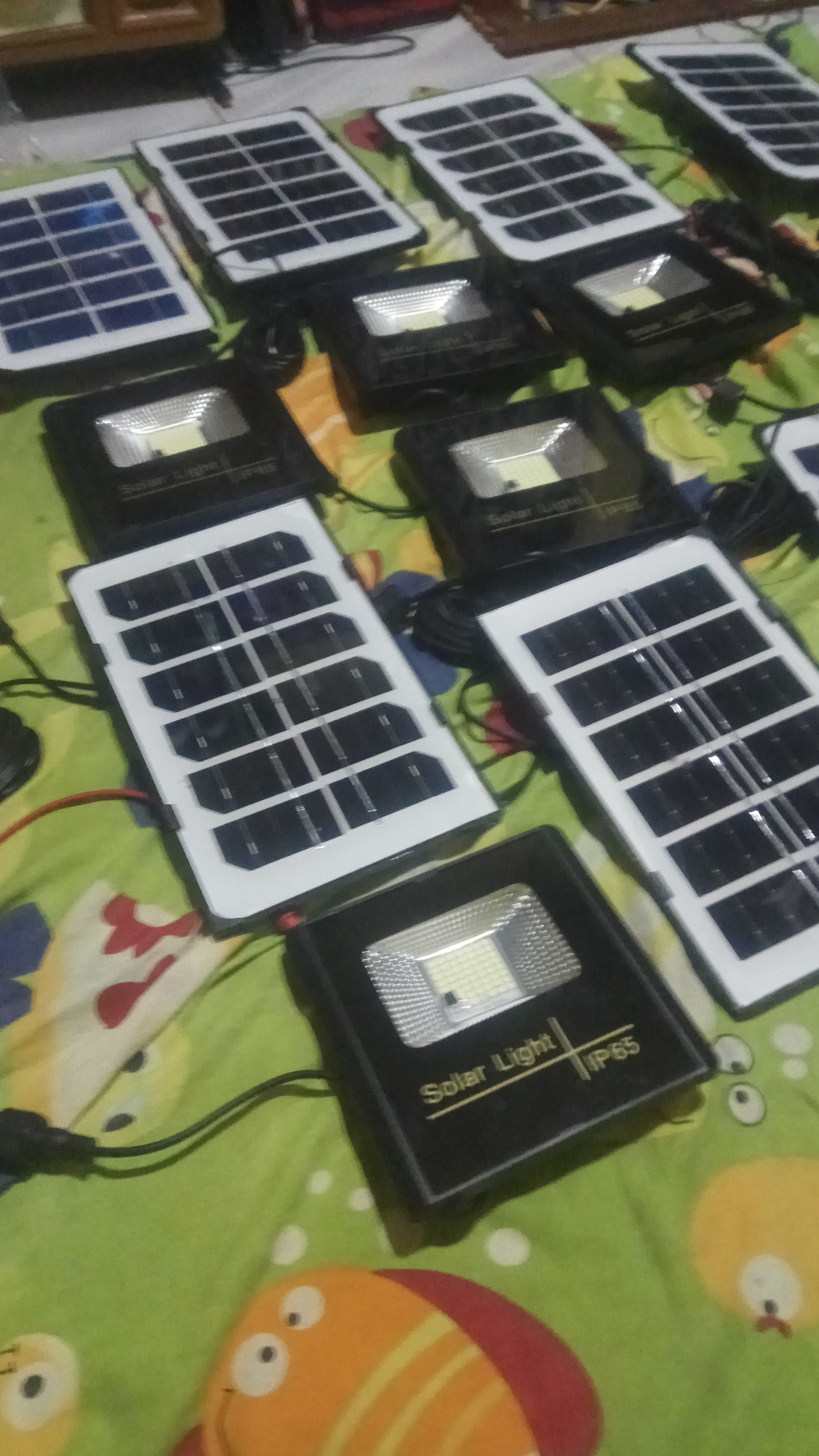
Solar panel for internally displaced persons camp

Participatory Climate Change Vulnerability Mapping: Engaging frontline communities to identify vulnerabilities to climate change impacts.

Trees For Schools: Providing schools with trees to aid nutrition and carbon sequestration.

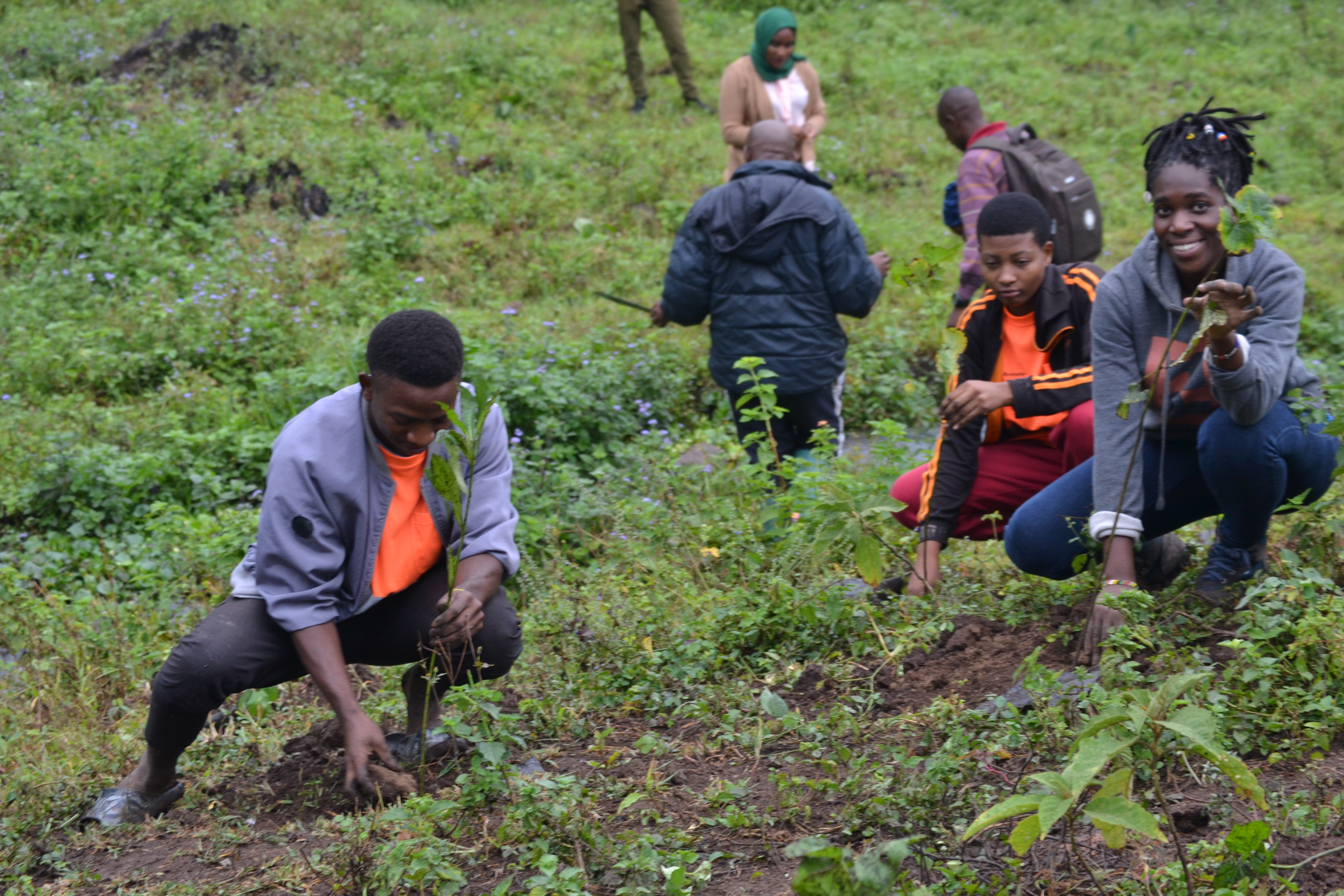
planting trees for schools

Participatory Land Use Planning: Engaging frontline communities to identify vulnerabilities to climate change impacts.

Capacity Building Of Students In FCT To Respond To Climate Change: Raising the Next Generation of Environmental Stewards.

Waste Recycling Scheme in collaboration with Global Environmental Facility (GEF).
