= Carbon farming =

Agricultural methods that capture carbon

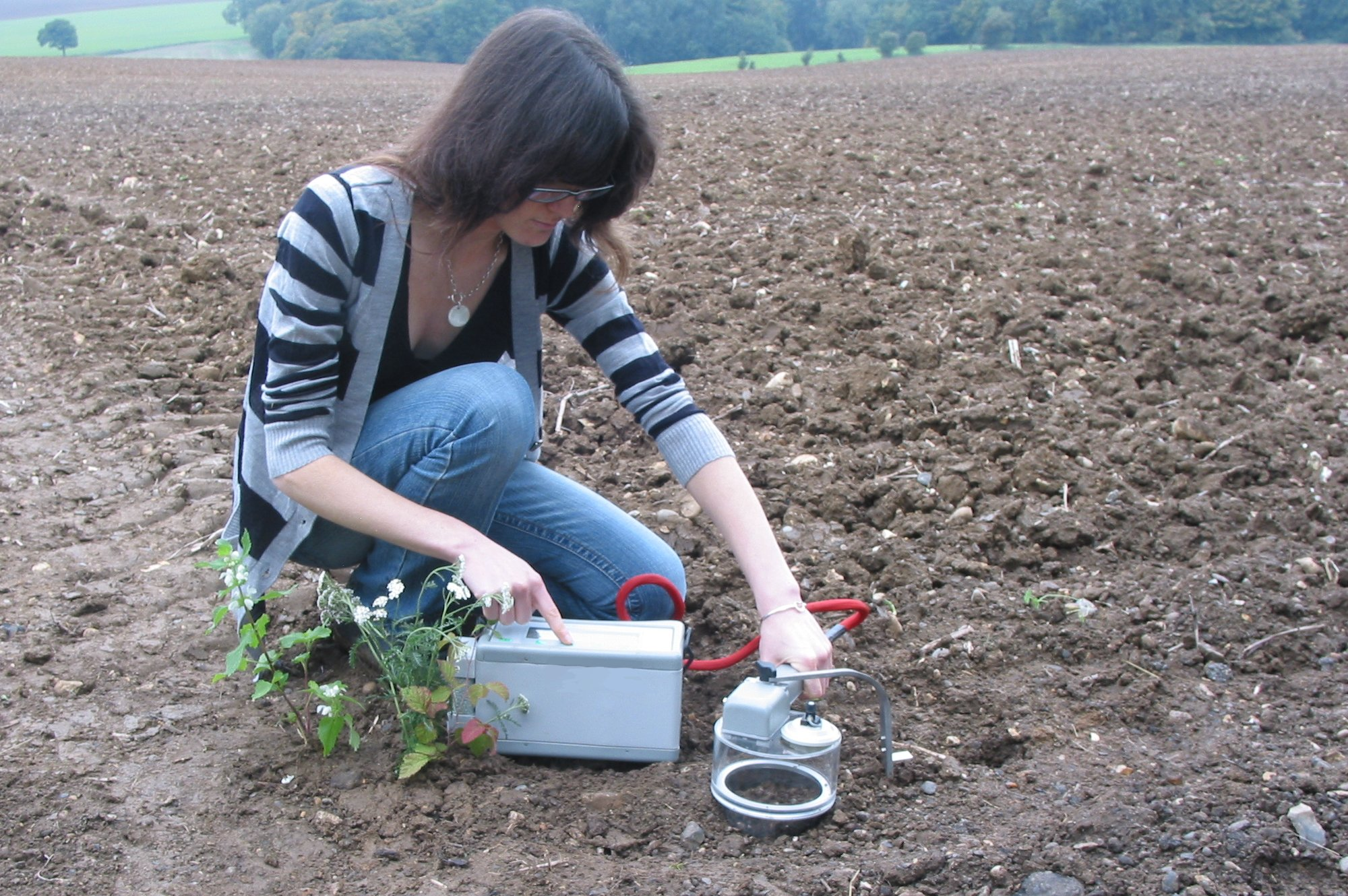
Measuring soil respiration on agricultural land. Carbon farming enhances carbon sequestration in the soil.

Carbon farming is a set of agricultural methods that aim to store carbon in the soil and biomass. The technical term for this is carbon sequestration. The overall goal of carbon farming is to create a net loss of carbon from the atmosphere. This is done by increasing the rate at which carbon is sequestered into soil and plant material. The increase of biomass from roots and the soil's microbiome leads to an increase in the organic matter content of the soil. Increasing organic matter content in soils aids plant growth, improves soil water retention capacity and reduces fertilizer use. Sustainable forest management is another tool that is used in carbon farming. Carbon farming is one component of climate-smart agriculture. It is also one way to remove carbon dioxide from the atmosphere.

Agricultural methods for carbon farming include adjusting how tillage and livestock grazing is done, using organic mulch or compost, working with biochar and terra preta, and changing the crop types. Methods used in forestry include reforestation and bamboo farming. As of 2016, variants of carbon farming reached hundreds of millions of hectares globally, of the nearly 5 billion hectares (1.2×10^{10} acres) of world farmland.

Carbon farming tends to be more expensive than conventional agricultural practices. Depending on the region, carbon farmings costs US$3-130 per tonne of carbon dioxide sequestered. Some countries provide subsidies to farmers to use carbon farming methods. While the implementation of carbon farming methods can reduce/sequester emissions, it is important to also consider the effects of land use changes with respect to the conversion of forests to agricultural production.

== Aims ==
The overall aim of carbon farming is to store carbon in the soil, crop roots, wood and leaves. It is one of several methods for carbon sequestration. It can be achieved by modification of agricultural practices because soil can act as an effective carbon sink and thus offset carbon dioxide emissions.

Agricultural sequestration practices may have positive effects on soil, air, and water quality, be beneficial to wildlife, and expand food production. On degraded croplands, an increase of one ton of soil carbon pool may increase crop yield by 20 to 40 kilograms per hectare of wheat, 10 to 20 kg/ha for maize, and 0.5 to 1 kg/ha for cowpeas.

== Mechanism ==
Compared to natural vegetation, cropland soils are depleted in soil organic carbon (SOC). When a soil is converted from natural land or semi natural land, such as forests, woodlands, grasslands, steppes and savannas, the SOC content in the soil reduces by about 30–40%. The loss of carbon through agricultural practices can eventually lead to the loss of soil suitable for agriculture. The carbon loss from the soil is due to the removal of plant material containing carbon, via harvesting. When land use changes, soil carbon either increases or decreases. This change continues until the soil reaches a new equilibrium. Deviations from this equilibrium can also be affected by varying climate. The decrease can be counteracted by increasing carbon input. This can be done via several strategies, e.g. leaving harvest residues on the field, using manure or rotating perennial crops. Perennial crops have a larger below ground biomass fraction, which increases the SOC content. Globally, soils are estimated to contain >8,580 gigatons of organic carbon, about ten times the amount in the atmosphere and much more than in vegetation.

In part, soil carbon is thought to accumulate when decaying organic matter was physically mixed with soil. Small roots die and decay while the plant is alive, depositing carbon below the surface. More recently, the role of living plants has been emphasized where carbon is released as plants grow. Soils can contain up to 5% carbon by weight, including decomposing plant and animal matter and biochar.

About half of soil carbon is found within deep soils. About 90% of this is stabilized by mineral–organic associations.

== Scale ==
Carbon farming can offset as much as 20% of 2010 carbon dioxide emissions annually. As of 2016, variants of carbon farming reached hundreds of millions of hectares globally, of the nearly 5 billion hectares (1.2×10^{10} acres) of world farmland.

However, the effects of soil sequestration can be reversed. If the soil is disrupted or intensive tillage practices are used, the soil becomes a net source of greenhouse gases. Typically after several decades of sequestration, the soil becomes saturated and ceases to absorb carbon. This implies that there is a global limit to the amount of carbon that soil can hold.

== Methods used in agriculture ==
All crops absorb CO_{2} during growth and release it after harvest. The goal of agricultural carbon removal is to use the crop and its relation to the carbon cycle to permanently sequester carbon within the soil. This is done by selecting farming methods that return biomass to the soil and enhance the conditions in which the carbon within the plants will be reduced to its elemental nature and stored in a stable state. Methods for accomplishing this include:

- Use cover crops such as grasses and weeds as a temporary cover between planting seasons
- Concentrate livestock in small paddocks for days at a time so they graze lightly but evenly. This encourages roots to grow deeper into the soil. Stock also till the soil with their hooves, grinding old grass and manures into the soil.
- Cover bare paddocks with hay or dead vegetation. This protects soil from the sun and allows the soil to hold more water and be more attractive to carbon-capturing microbes.
- Restore degraded, marginal, and abandoned land, which slows carbon release while returning the land to agriculture or other use. Degraded land with low soil carbon pool has particularly high potential to store soil carbon, which can be farther enhanced by proper selection of vegetation.

=== Adjusting livestock grazing ===
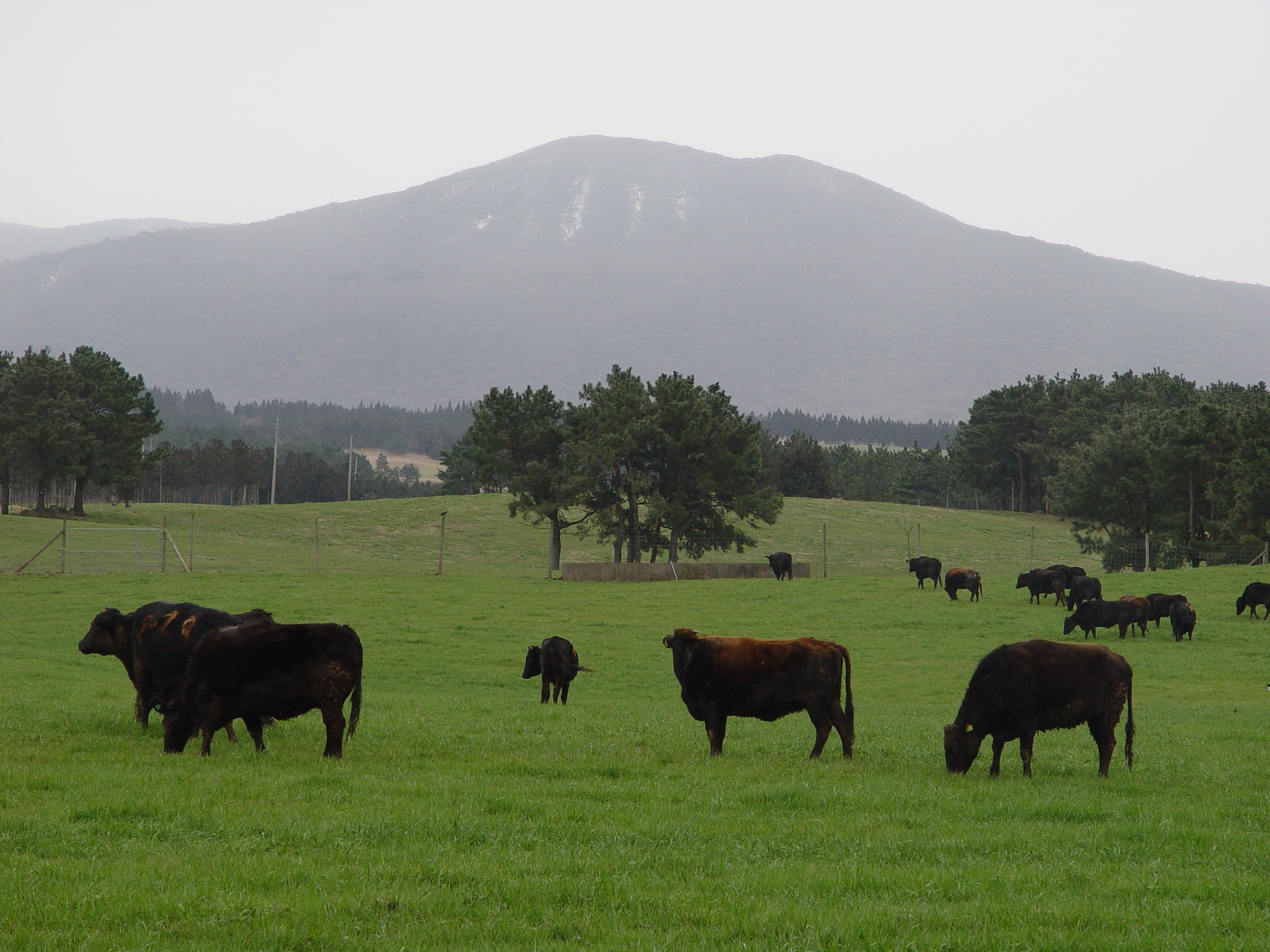
Cattle grazing

Livestock, like all animals, are net producers of carbon. Ruminants like cows and sheep produce not only CO_{2}, but also methane due to the microbes residing in their digestive system. A small amount of carbon may be sequestered in grassland soils through root exudates and manure. By regularly rotating the herd through multiple paddocks (as often as daily) the paddocks can rest/recover between grazing periods. This pattern produces stable grasslands with significant fodder. Annual grasses have shallower roots and die once they are grazed. Rotational grazing leads to the replacement of annuals by perennials with deeper roots, which can recover after grazing. By contrast, allowing animals to range over a large area for an extended period can destroy the grassland.

Silvopasture involves grazing livestock under tree cover, with trees separated enough to allow adequate sunlight to nourish the grass. For example, a farm in Mexico planted native trees on a paddock spanning 22 hectares (54 acres). This evolved into a successful organic dairy. The operation became a subsistence farm, earning income from consulting/training others rather than from crop production.

However, many researchers have argued the approach is unable to provide the benefits claimed. Moreover, several peer-reviewed studies have found that excluding livestock completely from semi-arid grasslands can lead to significant recovery of vegetation and soil carbon sequestration.

=== Adjusting tillage ===
Carbon farming minimizes disruption to soils over the planting/growing/harvest cycle. Tillage is avoided using seed drills or similar techniques. Livestock can trample and/or eat the remains of a harvested field. The reduction or complete halt of tilling will create an increase in the soil carbon concentrations of topsoil allowing for regeneration of the soil. Plowing splits soil aggregates and allows microorganisms to consume their organic compounds. The increased microbial activity releases nutrients, initially boosting yield. Thereafter the loss of structure reduces soil's ability to hold water and resist erosion, thereby reducing yield.

=== Using organic mulch and compost ===
Mulching covers the soil around plants with a mulch of wood chips or straw. Alternatively, crop residue can be left in place to enter the soil as it decomposes.

Compost sequesters carbon in a stable (not easily accessed) form. Carbon farmers spread it over the soil surface without tilling. A 2013 study found that a single compost application significantly and durably increased grassland carbon storage by 25–70%. The continuation sequestration likely came from increased water-holding and "fertilization" by compost decomposition. Both factors support increased productivity. Both tested sites showed large increases in grassland productivity: a forage increase of 78% in a drier valley site, while a wetter coastal site averaged an increase of 42%. CH_{4} and N_{2}O and emissions did not increase significantly. Methane fluxes were negligible. Soil N_{2}O emissions from temperate grasslands amended with chemical fertilizers and manures were orders of magnitude higher. Another study found that grasslands treated with .5" of commercial compost began absorbing carbon at an annual rate of nearly 1.5 tons/acre and continued to do so in subsequent years. As of 2018, this study had not been replicated.

=== Working with biochar and terra preta ===
Mixing anaerobically burned biochar into soil sequesters approximately 50% of the carbon in the biomass. Globally up to 12% of the anthropogenic carbon emissions from land use change (0.21 gigatonnes) can be off-set annually in soil, if slash-and-burn is replaced by slash-and-char. Agriculture and forestry wastes could add some 0.16 gigatonnes/year. Biofuel production using modern biomass can produce a bio-char by-product through pyrolysis sequestering 30.6 kg for each gigajoule of energy produced. Soil-sequestered carbon is easily and verifiably measured.

=== Adjusting crop type ===
Cover crops are fast-growing species planted to protect soils from wind and water erosion during the off-growing season. The cover crop may be incorporated into the soil to increase soil organic matter. Legume cover crops can also produce a small amount of nitrogen. The carbon content of a soil should not be increased without also ensuring that the relative amount of nitrogen also increases to maintain a healthy soil ecosystem.

Perennial crops offer potential to sequester carbon when grown in multilayered systems. One system uses perennial staple crops that grow on trees that are analogs to maize and beans, or vines, palms and herbaceous perennials.

== Methods used in forestry ==
=== Reforestation ===
Forestry and agriculture are both land-based human activities that add up to contribute approximately a third of the world's greenhouse gas emissions. There is a large interest in reforestation, but in regards to carbon farming most of that reforestation opportunity will be in small patches with trees being planted by individual land owners in exchange for benefits provided by carbon farming programs. Forestry in carbon farming can be both reforestation, which is restoring forests to areas that were deforested, and afforestation which would be planting forests in areas that were not historically forested. Not all forests will sequester the same amount of carbon. Carbon sequestration is dependent on several factors which can include forest age, forest type, amount of biodiversity, the management practices the forest is experiences and climate. Biodiversity is often thought to be a side benefit of carbon farming, but in forest ecosystems increased biodiversity can increase the rate of carbon sequestration and can be a tool in carbon farming and not just a side benefit.

=== Bamboo farming ===
A bamboo forest will store less total carbon than most types of mature forest. However, it can store a similar total amount of carbon as rubber plantations and tree orchards, and can surpass the total carbon stored in agroforests, palm oil plantations, grasslands and shrublands. A bamboo plantation sequesters carbon at a faster rate than a mature forest or a tree plantation. However it has been found that only new plantations or plantations with active management will be sequestering carbon at a faster rate than mature forests. Compared with other fast-growing tree species, bamboo is only superior in its ability to sequester carbon if selectively harvested. Bamboo forests are especially high in potential for carbon sequestration if the cultivated plant material is turned into durable products that keep the carbon in the plant material for a long period because bamboo is both fast growing and regrows strongly following an annual harvest.

While bamboo has the ability to store carbon as biomass in cultivated material, more than half of the carbon sequestration from bamboo will be stored as carbon in the soil. Carbon that is sequestered into the soil by bamboo is stored by the rhizomes and roots which is biomass that will remain in the soil after plant material above the soil is harvested and stored long-term. Bamboo can be planted in sub-optimal land unsuitable for cultivating other crops and the benefits would include not only carbon sequestration but improving the quality of the land for future crops and reducing the amount of land subject to deforestation. The use of carbon emission trading is also available to farmers who use bamboo to gain carbon credit in otherwise uncultivated land. Therefore, the farming of bamboo timber may have significant carbon sequestration potential.

== Costs and financial incentives ==
Many factors affect the costs of carbon sequestration including soil quality, transaction costs and various externalities such as leakage and unforeseen environmental damage. Because reduction of atmospheric CO_{2} is a long-term concern, farmers can be reluctant to adopt more expensive agricultural techniques when there is not a clear crop, soil, or economic benefit.

Carbon farming methods might have additional costs. Individual land owners are sometimes given incentives to use carbon farming methods through government policies. Governments in Australia and New Zealand are considering allowing farmers to sell carbon credits once they document that they have sufficiently increased soil carbon content.

Approved practices may make farmers eligible for federal funds. Not all carbon farming techniques have been recommended.

== Challenges ==
Carbon farming is not without its challenges or disadvantages. When ecosystem restoration is used as a form of carbon farming, there can be a lack of knowledge that is disadvantageous in project planning. Ecosystem services are often a side benefit of restoring ecosystems along with carbon farming, but often ecosystem services are ignored in project planning because, unlike carbon sequestration, is not a global commodity that can be traded. If and how carbon farming's additional sequestration methods can affect ecosystem services should be researched to determine how different methods and strategies will impact the value an ecosystem service in particular areas. One concern to note is that if policy and incentives are only aimed towards carbon sequestration, then carbon farming could actually be harmful to ecosystems. Carbon farming could inadvertently cause an increase of land clearing and monocultures when species diversity is not a goal of the landscapes project, so there should be attempts to balance the goals of carbon farming and biodiversity should be attempted.

Critics say that the related regenerative agriculture cannot be adopted enough to matter or that it could lower commodity prices. The impact of increased soil carbon on yield has yet to be settled.

Another criticism says that no-till practices may increase herbicide use, diminishing or eliminating carbon benefits.

Composting is not an NRCS-approved technique and its impacts on native species and greenhouse emissions during production have not been fully resolved. Further, commercial compost supplies are too limited to cover large amounts of land.

Carbon farming may consider related issues such as groundwater and surface water degradation.

== Related concepts ==
=== Climate-smart agriculture ===
Climate-smart agriculture (CSA), or climate resilient agriculture, is a set of farming methods that has three main objectives with regard to climate change. First, they use adaptation methods to respond to the effects of climate change on agriculture (this also builds resilience to climate change). Second, they aim to increase agricultural productivity and to ensure food security for a growing world population. Third, they try to reduce greenhouse gas emissions from agriculture as much as possible (e.g., by following carbon farming approaches). Climate-smart agriculture works as an integrated approach to managing land. This approach helps farmers to adapt their agricultural methods (for raising livestock and crops) to the effects of climate change.

=== Blue carbon ===
Blue carbon is a concept within climate change mitigation that refers to "biologically driven carbon fluxes and storage in marine systems that are amenable to management". Most commonly, it refers to the role that tidal marshes, mangroves and seagrass meadows can play in carbon sequestration. Whether macroalgae (seaweeds) can be considered blue carbon ecosystems remains contentious. These ecosystems can play an important role for climate change mitigation and ecosystem-based adaptation. However, when blue carbon ecosystems are degraded or lost, they release carbon back to the atmosphere, thereby adding to greenhouse gas emissions.

== By country or region ==
=== Australia ===
In 2011 Australia started a cap-and-trade program. Farmers who sequester carbon can sell carbon credits to companies in need of carbon offsets. The country's Direct Action Plan states "The single largest opportunity for CO_{2} emissions reduction in Australia is through bio-sequestration in general, and in particular, the replenishment of our soil carbons." In studies of test plots over 20 years showed increased microbial activity when farmers incorporated organic matter or reduced tillage. Soil carbon levels from 1990 to 2006 declined by 30% on average under continuous cropping. Incorporating organic matter alone was not enough to build soil carbon. Nitrogen, phosphorus and sulphur had to be added as well to do so.

=== Canada ===
By 2014 more than 75% of Canadian Prairies' cropland had adopted "conservation tillage" and more than 50% had adopted no-till. Twenty-five countries pledged to adopt the practice at the December 2015 Paris climate talks. The Canadian government has allocated CAD$885M to spend between 2021-31 on adopting climate solutions in agriculture as part of the CAD$2B Natural Climate Solutions Fund.

=== France ===
The largest international effort to promote carbon farming is "four per 1,000", led by France. Its goal is to increase soil carbon by 0.4% per year through agricultural and forestry changes. In 2016, France implemented a cap on the amount of energy crops that could be used to produce biofuels to limit competition with food crop production. Cover crops are exempted from this cap in order to create a financial incentive to adopt cover cropping.

=== Switzerland ===
A public-private partnership project, Agroimpact, has been launched in French-speaking part of Switzerland. It advises farmers on how to sequester carbon and compensates them based on the CO2 emissions avoided as a result.

Funding is provided by stakeholders in the agri-food sector who pay a premium to farmers, enabling them to improve their own carbon footprint. Each premium corresponds to a specific quantity of low-carbon products, which the farmers must commit to purchasing from the same supplier (for example, the same mill in the case of premiums paid to a producer of bread wheat).

=== United States of America ===
In California multiple Resource Conservation Districts (RCDs) support local partnerships to develop and implement carbon farming, In 2015 the agency that administers California's carbon-credit exchange began granting credits to farmers who compost grazing lands. In 2016 Chevrolet partnered with the US Department of Agriculture (USDA) to purchase 40,000 carbon credits from ranchers on 11,000 no-till acres. The transaction equates to removing 5,000 cars from the road and was the largest to date in the US. In 2017 multiple US states passed legislation in support of carbon farming and soil health.

- California appropriated $7.5 million as part of its Healthy Soils Program. The objective is to demonstrate that "specific management practices sequester carbon, improve soil health and reduce atmospheric greenhouse gases." The program includes mulching, cover crops, composting, hedgerows and buffer strips. Nearly half of California counties have farmers who are working on carbon-farming.
- Maryland's Healthy Soils Program supports research, education and technical assistance.
- Massachusetts funds education and training to support agriculture that regenerates soil health.
- Hawaii created the Carbon Farming Task Force to develop incentives to increase soil carbon content. A 250-acre demonstration project attempted to produce biofuels from the pongamia tree. Pongamia adds nitrogen to the soil. Similarly, one ranch husbands 2,000 head of cattle on 4,000 acres, using rotational grazing to build soil, store carbon, restore hydrologic function and reduce runoff.

Other states are considering similar programs.

== See also ==
- Agroforestry
- Carbon sink
- Effects of climate change on agriculture
- Effects of climate change on livestock
- Greenhouse gas emissions from agriculture
- Mycorrhizal fungi and soil carbon storage
- Seaweed farming
- Soil carbon feedback
