= Climate risk insurance =

Insurance to mitigate risks from climate change

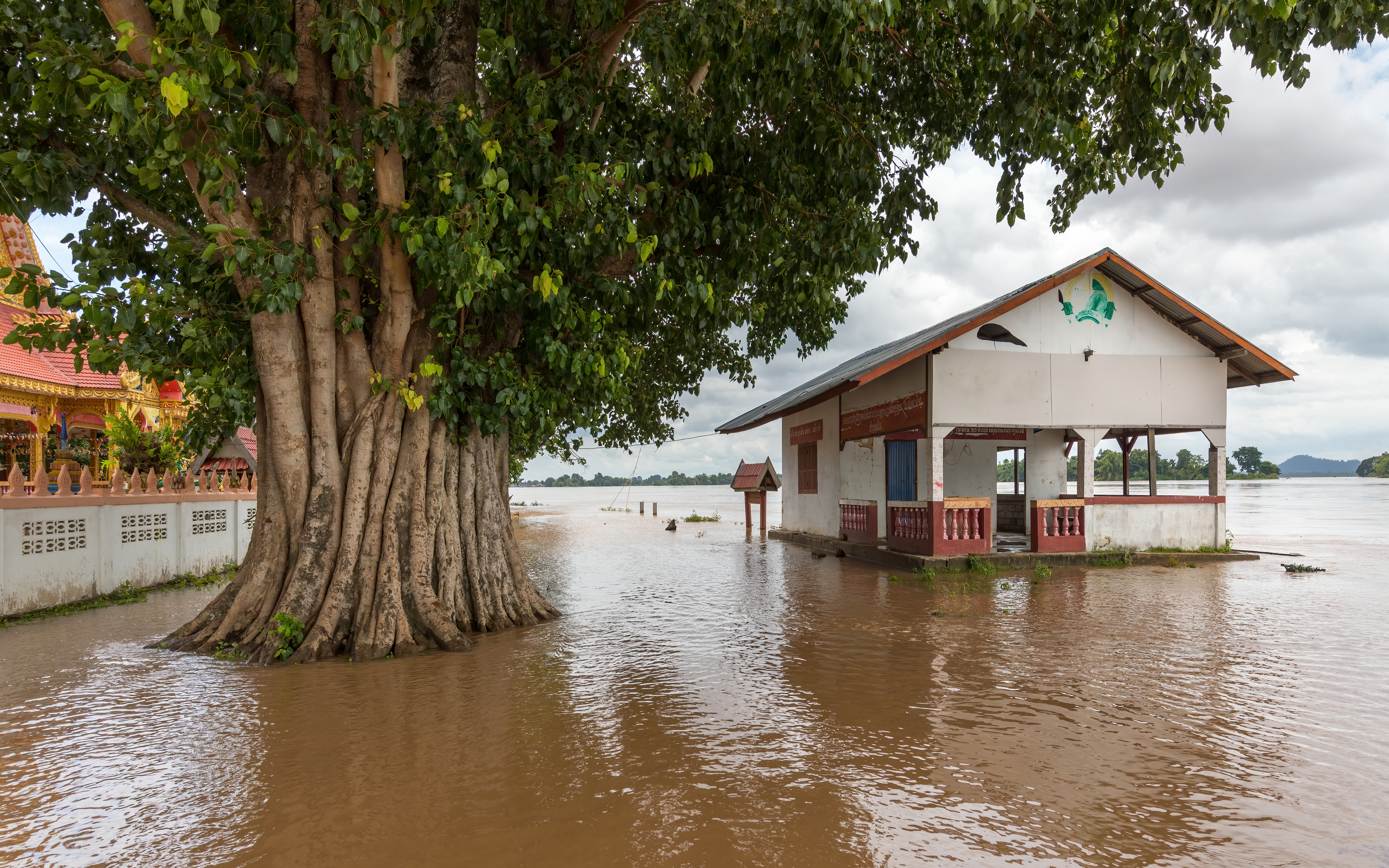
Flooded building in Si Phan Don, Laos, September 2019

Climate risk insurance is a type of insurance designed to mitigate the financial and other risk associated with climate change, especially phenomena like extreme weather. The insurance is often treated as a type of insurance needed for improving the climate resilience of poor and developing communities. It provides post-disaster liquidity for relief and reconstruction measures while also preparing for the future measures in order to reduce climate change vulnerability. Insurance is considered an important climate change adaptation measure.

== Criticism ==
Critics of the insurance, say that such insurance places the bulk of the economic burden on communities responsible for the least carbon emissions. For low-income countries, these insurance programmes can be expensive due to the high start-up costs and infrastructure requirements for the data collection. It is theorised that high-premiums in high risk areas experiencing increased climate threats, would discourage settlement in those areas. These programmes are also usually timely and financially inadequate, which could be an uncertainty to national budgets. A considerable problem on a micro-level is that weather-related disasters usually affect whole regions or communities at the same time, resulting in a large number of claims simultaneously. This means that it is needed to be sold on a very large, diversified scale. However a well-designed climate risk insurance can act as a safety net for countries while improving resilience.

== Initiatives ==
The international community invested in developing further support for this kind of insurance through the InsuResilience Global Partnership launched at COP23. That group, supports regional programs such as Climate Risk Adaptation and Insurance in the Caribbean (CRAIC) and international organizations like the Munich Climate Insurance Initiative. The ACT Alliance published a guidebook for equitable and climate justice oriented model for climate risk insurance in 2020.

== Types of climate risk insurance ==
=== Flood insurance ===
The rising climate change related risks, such as sea level rise, floods and windstorms, threaten the livability and affordability of the impacted areas. This is why one of the more widely used forms of climate risk insurance is flood insurance, which provides coverage against loss caused by flooding.
