= Climate risk management =

Strategies for mitigating risks from climate change

Climate risk management (CRM) is a term describing the strategies involved in reducing climate risk, through the work of various fields including climate change adaptation, disaster management and sustainable development. Major international conferences and workshops include: United Nations Framework Convention on Climate Change, World Meteorological Organization - Living With Climate.

== Definition ==
Climate risk management is a generic term referring to an approach to climate-sensitive decision making. The approach seeks to promote sustainable development by reducing the vulnerability associated with climate risk. CRM involves strategies aimed at maximizing positive and minimizing negative outcomes for communities in fields such as agriculture, food security, water resources, and health.

Climate risk management covers a broad range of potential actions, including: early-response systems, strategic diversification, dynamic resource-allocation rules, financial instruments (such as climate risk insurance), infrastructure design and capacity building. In addition to avoiding adverse outcomes, a climate risk management strategy also aims to maximize opportunities in climate-sensitive economic sectors--for example, farmers who use favorable seasonal forecasts to maximize their crop productivity.

== Major international conferences and workshops ==
=== United Nations Framework Convention on Climate Change ===
The United Nations Framework Convention on Climate Change involves negotiations among delegates on climate change framework. Discussions center on mitigation, adaptation, technology development and transfer, and financial resources and investment. During COP21, the international community funded investment in climate risk insurance as part of the strategies for addressing climate risk.

=== World Meteorological Organization - Living With Climate ===
The Living with Climate Conference was co-hosted by the World Meteorological Organization, the Earth Institute and the Finnish Meteorological Institute in July, 2006. The meeting was designed to review opportunities and constraints in integrating climate risks and uncertainties into decision-making. A major outcome was the Espoo Statement.

== See also ==
- Vulnerability
- Risk management
- Disaster risk reduction
- Finnish Meteorological Institute
- Earth Institute
- Climate change and insurance in the United States
