= Climate resilience =

Form of adaptive capacity for a socio-ecological system

Climate resilience is a concept to describe how well people or ecosystems are prepared to bounce back from certain climate hazard events. The formal definition of the term is the "capacity of social, economic and ecosystems to cope with a hazardous event or trend or disturbance". For example, climate resilience can be the ability to recover from climate-related shocks such as floods and droughts. Different actions can increase climate resilience of communities and ecosystems to help them cope. They can help to keep systems working in the face of external forces. For example, building a seawall to protect a coastal community from flooding might help maintain existing ways of life there.

To increase climate resilience means one has to reduce the climate vulnerability of people, communities and countries. This can be done in many different ways. They can be technological and infrastructural changes (including buildings and roads) or policy (e.g. laws and regulation). There are also social and community approaches, as well as nature-based ones, for example by restoring ecosystems like forests to act as natural barriers against climate impacts. These types of approaches are also known as climate change adaptation. Climate resilience is a broader concept that includes adaptation but also emphasizes a system-wide approach to managing risks. The changes have to be implemented at all scales of society, from local community action all the way to global treaties. It also emphasizes the need to transform systems and societies and to better cope with a changed climate.

To make societies more resilient, climate policies and plans should be shaped by choices that support sustainability. This kind of development has come to be known as climate resilient development. It has become a new paradigm for sustainable development. It influences theory and practice across all sectors globally. Two approaches that fall under this kind of development are climate resilient infrastructure and climate-smart agriculture. Another example are climate-resilient water services. These are services that provide access to high quality drinking water during all seasons and even during extreme weather events. On every continent, governments are now adopting policies for climate resilient economies. International frameworks such as the Paris Agreement and the Sustainable Development Goals are drivers for such initiatives.

Tools exist to measure climate resilience. They allow for comparisons of different groups of people through standardized metrics. Objective tools use fixed and transparent definitions of resilience. Two examples for objective tools are the Resilience Index Measurement and Analysis (RIMA) and the Livelihoods Change Over Time (LCOT). Subjective approaches on the other hand use people's feelings of what constitutes resilience. People then make their own assessment of their resilience.

== Definition ==
Climate resilience is generally considered to be the ability to recover from, or to mitigate vulnerability to, climate-related shocks such as floods and droughts. It is a political process that strengthens the ability of all to mitigate vulnerability to risks from, and adapt to changing patterns in, climate hazards and variability.

The IPCC Sixth Assessment Report considers climate resilience to be "the capacity of social, economic and ecosystems to cope with a hazardous event or trend or disturbance". It includes the abilities to reorganize and learn.

Resilience is a useful concept because it speaks across sectors and disciplines but this also makes it open to interpretation resulting in differing, and at times competing, definitions. The definition of climate resilience is heavily debated, in both conceptual and practical terms.

According to one framework, the three basic capacities of resilience are adaptive, anticipatory and absorptive capacity. Each of these capacities are more readily recognizable which also means that any changes can more easily be tracked. The focus is on resilience as an outcome of an action or program, and how to measure an improvement.

Climate resilience is strongly related to climate change adaptation because both have to do with strengthening the capacity of a system to withstand climate events. Adaptation and resilience are often used interchangeably, however, there are key differences.

- Resilience involves a more systematic approach to absorbing change. It involves using those changes to become more efficient. The idea is that people can intervene to reorganize the system when disturbance creates an opportunity to do so. Climate resilience is an important part of building system-level resilience to multiple shocks.
- Adaptation is any action or process that helps people or nature adjust to negative impacts of climate change. More rarely, it is about taking advantage of those changes.

Climate resilient development is a closely related area of work and research topic that has recently emerged. It describes situations in which adaptation, mitigation and development solutions are pursued together. It is able to benefit from synergies from among the actions and reduce trade-offs.

== Implementation ==
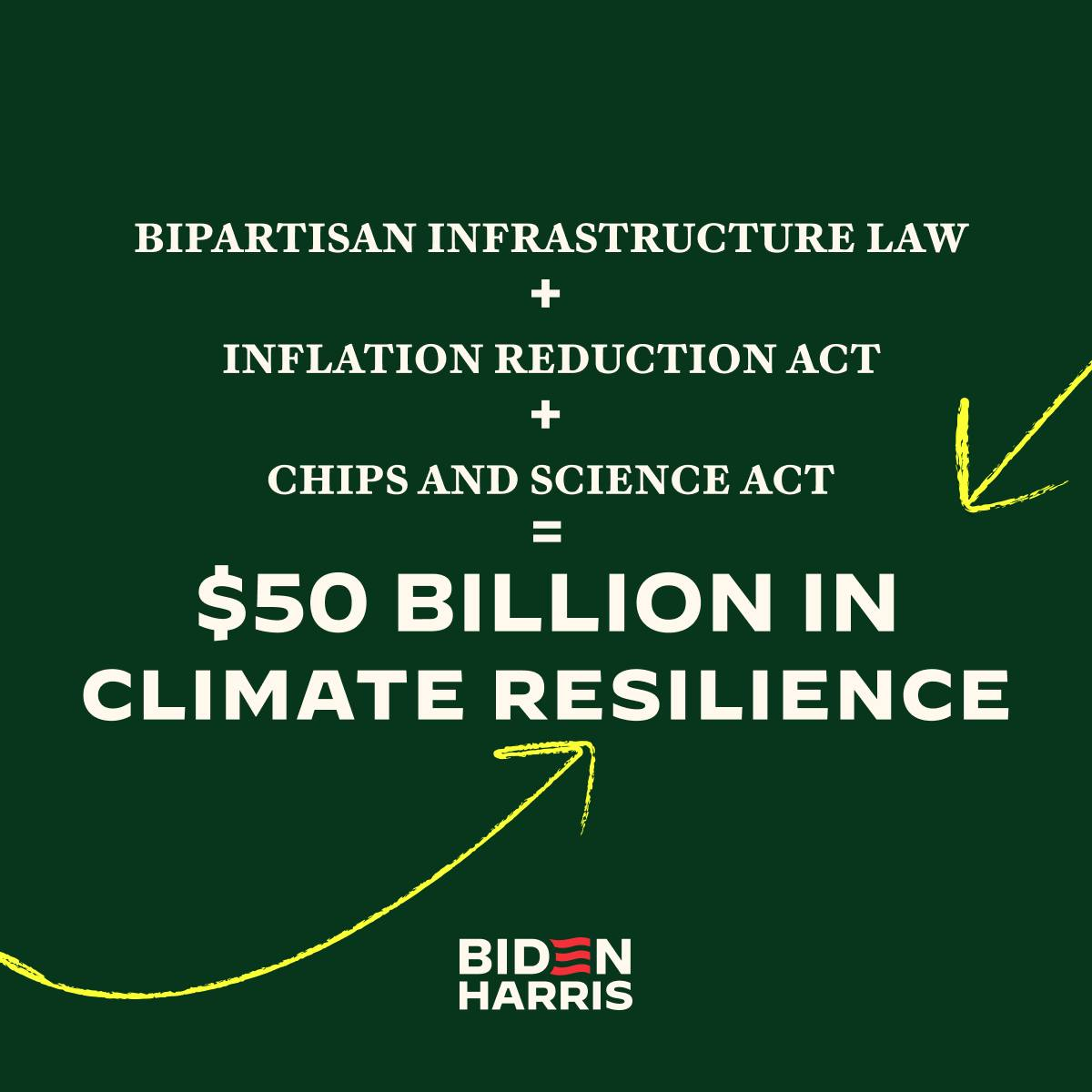
Climate Resilience Graphic used in re-election campaign of Joe Biden in the U.S.

Currently, the majority of work regarding climate resilience has focused on actions taken to maintain existing systems and structures. Such adaptations are also considered to be incremental actions rather than transformational ones. They can help to keep the system working in the face of external forces. For example, building a seawall to protect a coastal community from flooding might help maintain existing ways of life there. In this way, implemented adaptation builds upon resilience as a way of bouncing back to recover after a disturbance.

On the other hand, climate resilience projects can also be activities to promote and support transformational adaptation. This is because transformational adaptation is connected with implementation at scale and ideally at the system-level. Transformations, and the processes of transition, cover major systems and sectors at scale. These are energy, land and ecosystems, urban and infrastructure, and industrial and societal. Structural changes are also recognized as transformational. Changing land use regulations in a coastal community and establishing a programme of managed retreat are examples of structural changes. However, transformations may fail if they do not integrate social justice, consider power differences and political inclusion, and if they do not deliver improvements in incomes and wellbeing for everyone.

Building climate resilience is a challenging activity that involves a wide range of actors and agents. It can involve individuals, community organizations, corporations, government at all levels as well as international organizations. Research shows that the strongest indicator of successful climate resilience efforts at all scales is a well developed, existing network of social, political, economic and financial institutions that is already positioned to effectively take on the work of identifying and addressing the risks posed by climate change. Cities, states, and nations that have already developed such networks generally have far higher net incomes and gross domestic product (GDP).

== By sector ==
=== Development ===
"Climate resilient development" has become a new (albeit contested) paradigm for sustainable development, influencing theory and practice across all sectors globally. This is particularly true in the water sector, since water security is intimately connected to climate change. On every continent, governments are adopting policies for climate resilient economies, driven in part by international frameworks such as the Paris Agreement and the Sustainable Development Goals.

Climate resilient development "integrates adaptation measures and their enabling conditions with mitigation to advance sustainable development for all". It involves questions of equity and system transitions, and includes adaptations for human, ecosystem and planetary health. Climate resilient development is facilitated by developing partnerships with traditionally marginalized groups, including women, youth, Indigenous Peoples, local communities and ethnic minorities.

To achieve climate resilient development, the following actions are needed: increasing climate information, and financing and technical capacity for flexible and dynamic systems. This needs to be coupled with greater consideration of the socio-ecological resilience and context-specific values of marginalized communities and meaningful engagement with the most vulnerable in decision making. Consequently, resilience produces a range of challenges and opportunities when applied to sustainable development.

Income‐smoothing social insurance schemes can strengthen resilience to climate‐sensitive shocks. For instance, research by Thiemo Fetzer shows that India's workfare‐style employment guarantee programme weakened the linkage between climatic shocks negatively impacting rural incomes, and as a result reduced subsequent conflict.

=== Infrastructure ===
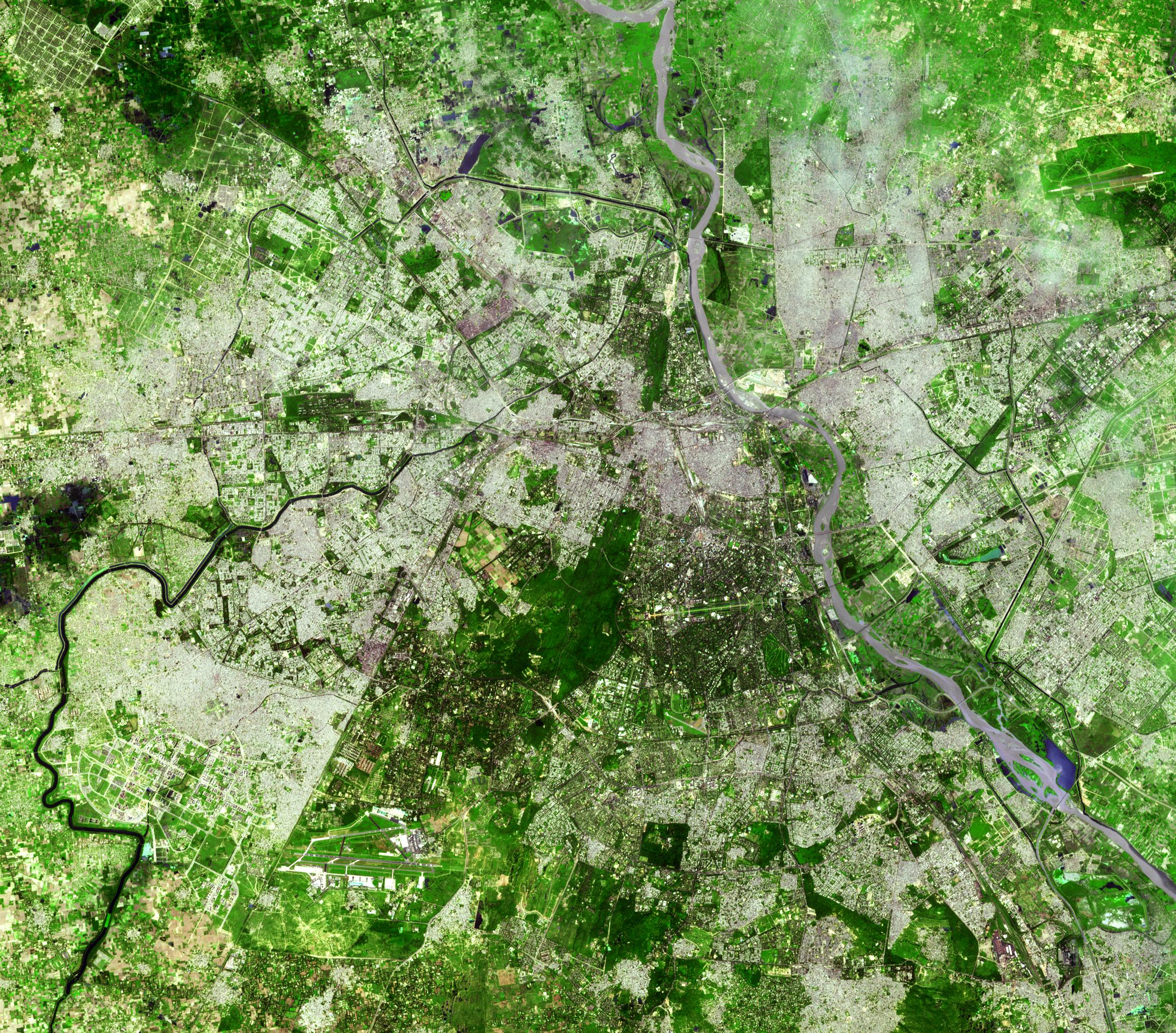
An aerial view of Delhi, India, where urban forests are being developed to improve the climate resilience of the city

Infrastructure failures can have broad-reaching consequences extending away from the site of the original event, and for a considerable duration after the immediate failure. Furthermore, increasing reliance infrastructure system interdependence, in combination with the effects of climate change and population growth all contribute to increasing vulnerability and exposure, and greater probability of catastrophic failures. To reduce this vulnerability, and in recognition of limited resources and future uncertainty about climate projections, new and existing long-lasting infrastructure must undergo a risk-based engineering and economic analyses to properly allocate resources and design for climate resilience.

Incorporating climate projections into building and infrastructure design standards, investment and appraisal criteria, and model building codes is currently not common. Some resilience guidelines and risk-informed frameworks have been developed by public entities. Such manuals can offer guidance for adaptive design methods, characterization of extremes, development of flood design criteria, flood load calculation and the application of adaptive risk management principals account for more severe climate/weather extremes. One example is the "Climate Resiliency Design Guidelines" by New York City.

=== Agriculture ===
Climate-smart agriculture (CSA), or climate resilient agriculture, is a set of farming methods that has three main objectives with regard to climate change. First, they use adaptation methods to respond to the effects of climate change on agriculture (this also builds resilience to climate change). Second, they aim to increase agricultural productivity and to ensure food security for a growing world population. Third, they try to reduce greenhouse gas emissions from agriculture as much as possible (e.g., by following carbon farming approaches). Climate-smart agriculture works as an integrated approach to managing land. This approach helps farmers to adapt their agricultural methods (for raising livestock and crops) to the effects of climate change.

CSA can assist in the research of the introduction of new crop varieties to address the changing climate. CSA can include the planting of heat tolerant crop varieties, mulching, boundary trees, and appropriate housing and spacing for cattle.

The term climate-smart agriculture has been criticized as a form of greenwashing for big businesses.

=== Water and sanitation ===
Climate-resilient water services (or climate-resilient WASH) are services that provide access to high quality drinking water during all seasons and even during extreme weather events. Climate resilience in general is the ability to recover from, or to mitigate vulnerability to, climate-related shocks such as floods and droughts. Climate resilient development has become the new paradigm for sustainable development. This concept thus influences theory and practice across all sectors globally. This is particularly true in the water sector, since water security is closely connected to climate change. On every continent, governments are now adopting policies for climate resilient economies. International frameworks such as the Paris Agreement and the Sustainable Development Goals are drivers for such initiatives.

Several activities can improve water security and increase resilience to climate risks: Carrying out a detailed analysis of climate risk to make climate information relevant to specific users; developing metrics for monitoring climate resilience in water systems (this will help to track progress and guide investments for water security); and using new institutional models that improve water security.

Climate resilient policies can be useful for allocating water, especially when regional water availability may change in future. This requires a good understanding of the current and future hydroclimatic situation. For example, a more accurate prediction of future changes in climate variability leads to a better response to their possible impacts.

=== Ecosystems ===
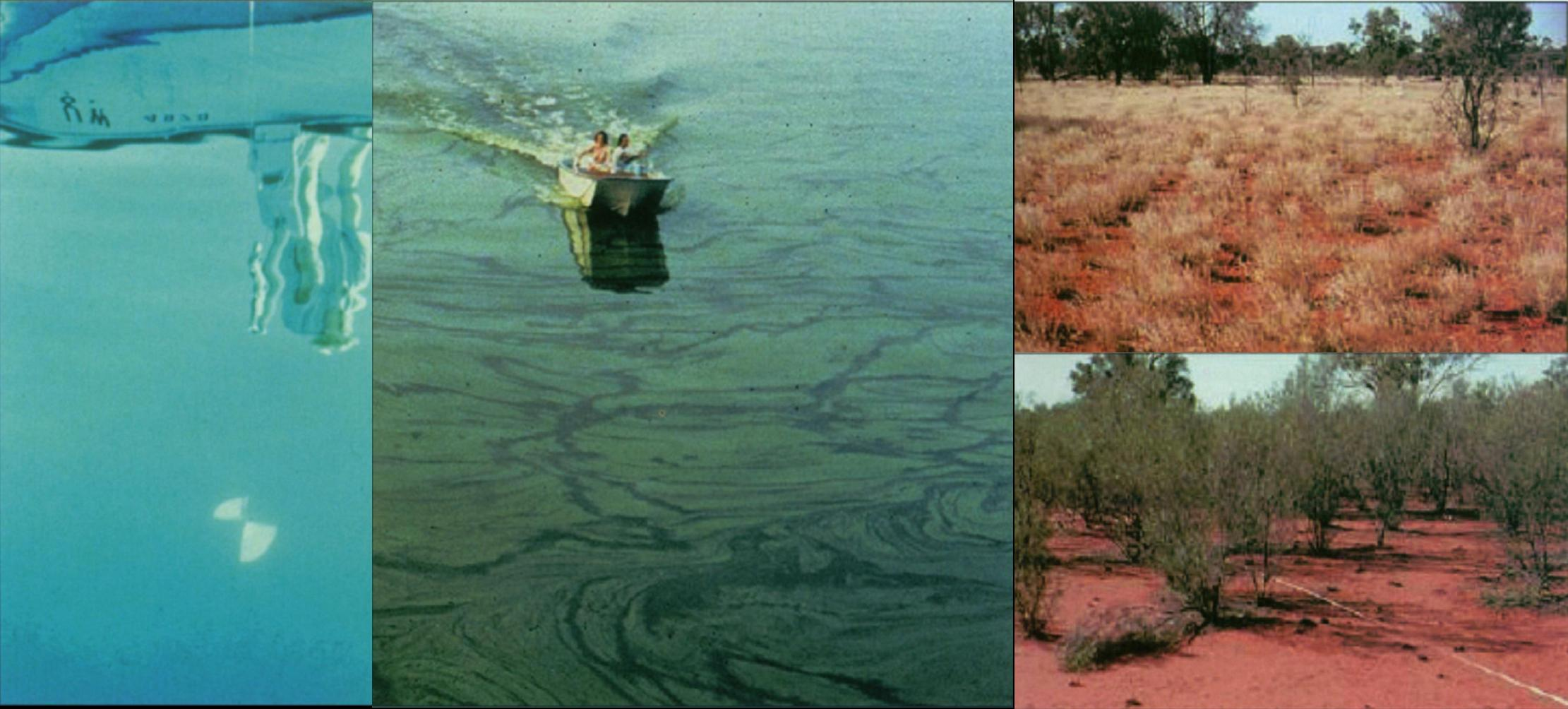
Lake and Mulga ecosystems with alternative stable states

In ecology, resilience is the capacity of an ecosystem to respond to a perturbation or disturbance by resisting damage and subsequently recovering. Such perturbations and disturbances can include stochastic events such as fires, flooding, windstorms, insect population explosions, and human activities such as deforestation, fracking of the ground for oil extraction, pesticide sprayed in soil, and the introduction of exotic plant or animal species. Disturbances of sufficient magnitude or duration can profoundly affect an ecosystem and may force an ecosystem to reach a threshold beyond which a different regime of processes and structures predominates. When such thresholds are associated with a critical or bifurcation point, these regime shifts may also be referred to as critical transitions.

Climate change caused by humans can worsen ecosystem resilience. It can lead to regime shifts in ecosystems, often to less desirable and degraded conditions. On the hand, some human actions can make ecosystems more resilient and help species adapt. Examples are protecting larger areas of semi-natural habitat and creating links between parts of the landscape to help species move.

=== Disaster management ===
At larger governmental levels, general programs to improve climate resiliency through greater disaster preparedness are being implemented. For example, in cases such as Norway, this includes the development of more sensitive and far-reaching early warning systems for extreme weather events, creation of emergency electricity power sources, enhanced public transportation systems, and more.

== Resilience assessment ==
Governments and development agencies are spending increasing amounts of finance to support resilience-building interventions. Resilience measurement can make valuable contributions in guiding resource allocations towards resilience-building. This includes targeted identification of vulnerability hotspots, a better understanding of the drivers of resilience, and tools to infer the impact and effectiveness of resilience-building interventions. In recent years, a large number of resilience measurement tools have emerged, offering ways to track and measure resilience at a range of scales - from individuals and households to communities and nations.

=== Indicators and indices ===
Efforts to measure climate resilience currently face several technical challenges. Firstly, the definition of resilience is heavily contested, making it difficult to choose appropriate characteristics and indicators to track. Secondly, the resilience or households or communities cannot be measured using a single observable metric. Resilience is made up of a range of processes and characteristics, many of which are intangible and difficult to observe (such as social capital). As a result, many resilience toolkits resort to using large lists of proxy indicators.

Indicator approaches use a composite index of many individual quantifiable indicators. To generate the index value or 'score', most often a simple average is calculated across a set of standardized values. However, sometimes weighting is done according what are thought to be the most important determinants of resilience.

=== Climate resilience framework ===
A climate resilience framework can better equip governments and policymakers to develop sustainable solutions that combat the effects of climate change. To begin with, climate resilience establishes the idea of multi-stable socio-ecological systems (socio-ecological systems can actually stabilize around a multitude of possible states). Secondly, climate resilience has played a critical role in emphasizing the importance of preventive action when assessing the effects of climate change. Although adaptation is always going to be a key consideration, making changes after the fact has a limited capability to help communities and nations deal with climate change. By working to build climate resilience, policymakers and governments can take a more comprehensive stance that works to mitigate the harms of climate change impacts before they happen. Finally, a climate resilience perspective encourages greater cross-scale connectedness of systems. Creating mechanisms of adaptation that occur in isolation at local, state, or national levels may leave the overall social-ecological system vulnerable. A resilience-based framework would require far more cross-talk, and the creation of environmental protections that are more holistically generated and implemented.

== Tools ==
Tools for resilience assessment vary depending on the sector, the scale and the entity such as households, communities or species. They vary also by the type of assessment, for example if the aim is to understand effectiveness of resilience-building interventions.

=== Community resilience assessment tools ===
Community resilience assessment is an important step toward reducing disasters from climate hazards. They are also helpful for being ready to take advantage of the opportunities to reorganize. There are many tools available for investigating the environmental, social, economic and physical features of a community that are important for resilience. A survey of the available tools found many differences between tools with no standardized approaches to assess resilience. One category of tools focuses mainly on measuring outcomes. In contrast tools that focus on measuring resilience at the 'starting point' or early stages and continuously over a project are a less common.

=== Livelihoods and food security ===
Most of the recent initiatives to measure resilience in rural development contexts share two shortcomings: complexity and high cost. USAID published a field guide for assessing climate resilience in smallholder supply chains.

Most objective approaches use fixed and transparent definitions of resilience and allow for different groups of people to be compared through standardized metrics. However, as many resilience processes and capacities are intangible, objective approaches are heavily reliant on crude proxies. Examples of commonly used objective measures include the Resilience Index Measurement and Analysis (RIMA) and the Livelihoods Change Over Time (LCOT).

Subjective approaches to resilience measurement take a contrasting view. They assume that people have a valid understanding of their resilience and seek to factor perceptions into the measurement process. They challenge the notion that experts are best placed to evaluate other people's lives. Subjective approaches use people's menu of what constitutes resilience and allow them to self-evaluate accordingly. An example is the Subjectively-Evaluated Resilience Score (SERS).

== Related concepts ==
=== Climate change adaptation ===
Climate change adaptation is the process of adjusting to the effects of climate change, both current and anticipated. Adaptation aims to moderate or avoid harm for people, and is usually done alongside climate change mitigation. It also aims to exploit opportunities. Adaptation can involve interventions to help natural systems cope with changes.

Adaptation can help manage impacts and risks to people and nature. The four types of adaptation actions are infrastructural, institutional, behavioural and nature-based options. Some examples are building seawalls or inland flood defenses, providing new insurance schemes, changing crop planting times or varieties, and installing green roofs or green spaces. Adaptation can be reactive (responding to climate impacts as they happen) or proactive (taking steps in anticipation of future climate change).

=== Climate change vulnerability ===
Climate change vulnerability is a measure of how strongly people or ecosystems are likely to be affected by climate change. Its formal definition is the "propensity or predisposition to be adversely affected" by climate change. It can apply to humans and also to natural systems (or ecosystems). Issues around the capacity to cope and adapt are also part of this concept. Vulnerability is a component of climate risk. It differs within communities and also across societies, regions, and countries. It can increase or decrease over time. Vulnerability is generally a bigger problem for people in low-income countries than for those in high-income countries.

Higher levels of vulnerability will be found in densely populated areas, in particular those affected by poverty, poor governance, and/or conflict. Also, some livelihoods are more sensitive to the effects of climate change than others. Smallholder farming, pastoralism, and fishing are livelihoods that may be especially vulnerable. Further drivers for vulnerability are unsustainable land and ocean use, marginalization, and historical and ongoing patterns of inequity and poor governance.

=== Disaster risk reduction ===
Disaster risk reduction aims to make disasters less likely to happen. The approach, also called DRR or disaster risk management, also aims to make disasters less damaging when they do occur. DRR aims to make communities stronger and better prepared to handle disasters. In technical terms, it aims to make them more resilient or less vulnerable. When DRR is successful, it makes communities less the vulnerable because it mitigates the effects of disasters. This means DRR can make risky events fewer and less severe. Climate change can increase climate hazards. So development efforts often consider DRR and climate change adaptation together.

It is possible to include DRR in almost all areas of development and humanitarian work. People from local communities, agencies or federal governments can all propose DRR strategies. DRR policies aim to "define goals and objectives across different timescales and with concrete targets, indicators and time frames."

== See also ==
- Ecological resilience – Capacity of ecosystems to resist and recover from change
- Resilience (engineering and construction) – Infrastructure design able to absorb damage without suffering complete failure
