= Exempli gratia =

Latin phrase meaning "for example"

Exempli gratia (usually abbreviated e.g.) is a Latin phrase that means "for example" or "for the sake of example". The abbreviation "e.g." is often interpreted (Anglicised) as "example given".

The plural exemplōrum gratiā, which was used to refer to multiple examples (separated by commas) is now not in frequent use; when used, it may be seen abbreviated as "ee.g." or even "ee.gg.", corresponding to the practice of doubling plurals in Latin abbreviations.

E.g. is often confused with i.e. (id est, meaning 'that is' or 'in other words').

== Styling practices ==
Exempli gratiā is usually abbreviated as "e. g." or "e.g." (less commonly, ex. gr.).

=== British versus American ===
"British" and "American" are not accurate as stand-ins for Commonwealth and North American English more broadly; actual practice varies even among national publishers. The Australian government's Style Manual for Authors, Editors and Printers preserves the points in the abbreviations, but eschews the comma after them (it similarly drops the title's serial comma before "and", which most UK and many US publishers would retain). Editing Canadian English by the Editors' Association of Canada uses the periods and the comma; so does A Canadian Writer's Reference. The government publication The Canadian Style uses the periods but not the comma.

Assertions that "eg" and "ie" style versus "e.g." and "i.e." style are two poles of British versus American usage, such as those by Bryan A. Garner in Garner's Modern English Usage, are not borne out by major style guides and usage dictionaries, which demonstrate wide variation. To the extent anything approaching a consistent general conflict can be identified, it is between American and British news companies' different approaches to the balance between clarity and expediency, without complete agreement on either side of the Atlantic, and with little evidence of effects outside journalism circles, e.g. in book publishing or academic journals.

There is no consistent British style. For example, The Oxford Dictionary for Writers and Editors has "e.g." and "i.e." with points (periods); Fowler's Modern English Usage takes the same approach, and its newest edition is especially emphatic about the points being retained. The Oxford Guide to Style (also republished in Oxford Style Manual and separately as New Hart's Rules) also has "e.g." and "i.e."; the examples it provides are of the short and simple variety that often see the comma dropped in American usage as well. None of those works prescribe specifically for or against a comma following these abbreviations, leaving it to writers' own judgment.

=== Style guides ===
Style guides are generally in agreement that both abbreviations are preceded by a comma or used inside a parenthetical construction, and are best confined to the latter and to footnotes and tables, rather than used in running prose.

Some specific publishers, primarily in news journalism, drop one or both forms of punctuation as a matter of house style. They seem more frequently to be British than American (perhaps owing to the AP Stylebook being treated as a de facto standard across most American newspapers, without a UK counterpart). For example, The Guardian uses "eg" and "ie" with no punctuation, while The Economist uses "eg," and "ie," with commas and without points, as does The Times of London. A 2014 revision to New Hart's Rules states that it is now "Oxford style" to not use a comma after e.g. and i.e. (which retain the points), "to avoid double punctuation". This is a rationale it does not apply to anything else, and Oxford University Press has not consistently imposed this style on its publications that post-date 2014, including Garner's Modern English Usage.

By way of US comparison, The New York Times uses "e.g." and "i.e.", without a rule about a following comma – like Oxford usage in actual practice. The Chicago Manual of Style requires "e.g.," and "i.e.,". The AP Stylebook preserves both types of punctuation for these abbreviations.

== See also ==
- List of Latin phrases
- List of Latin abbreviations
