= Effects of climate change on livestock =

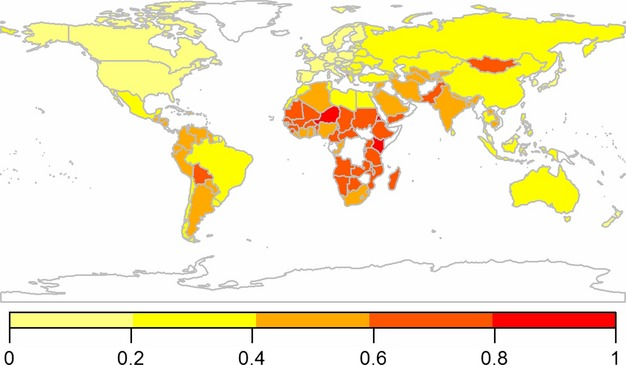
A map of countries considered most and least vulnerable to adverse impacts of climate change on their grazing livestock

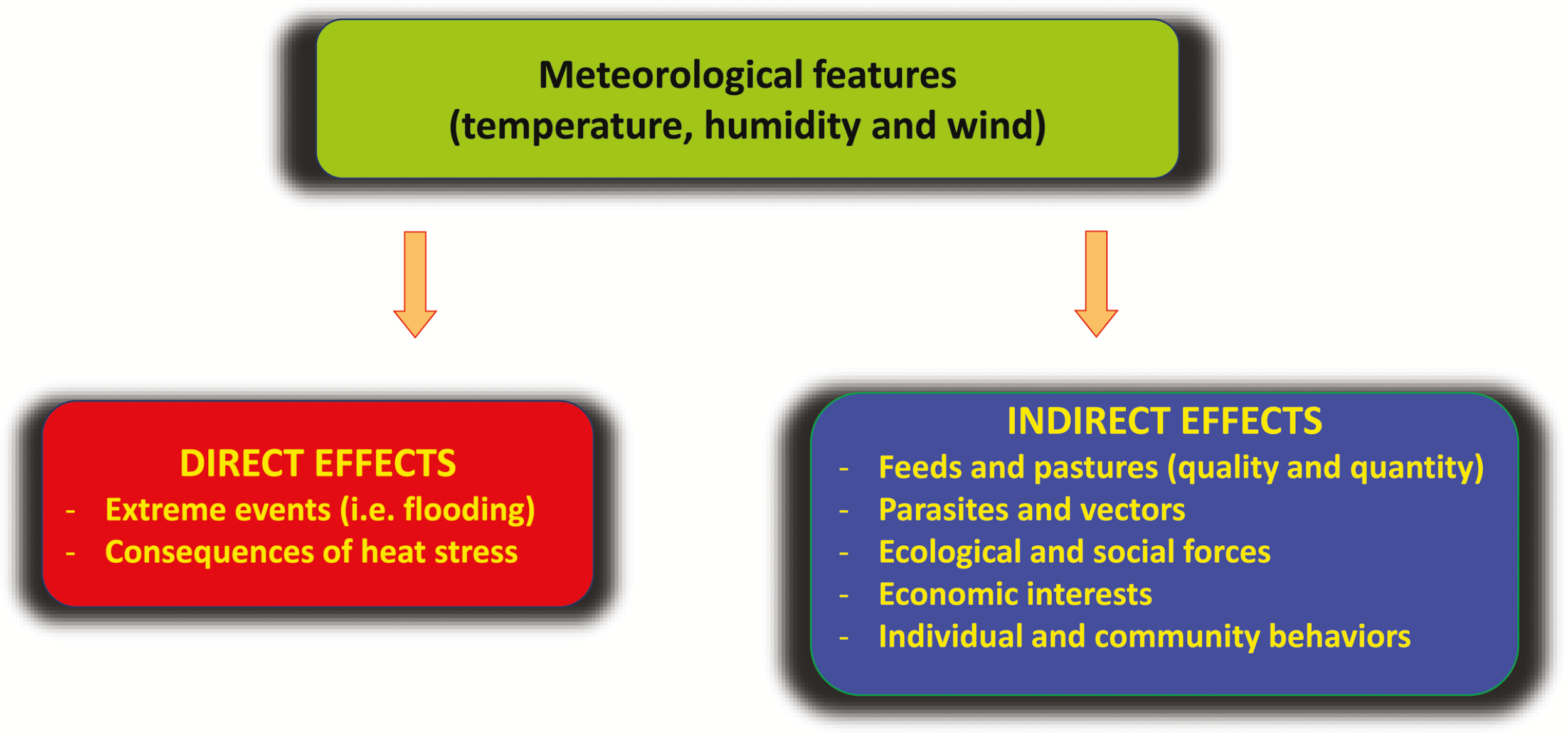
Multi-faceted impacts of climate change on livestock

There are numerous interlinked effects of climate change on livestock rearing. This activity is both heavily affected by and a substantial driver of anthropogenic climate change due to its greenhouse gas emissions. As of 2011, some 400 million people relied on livestock in some way to secure their livelihood. The commercial value of this sector is estimated as close to $1 trillion. As an outright end to human consumption of meat and animal products is not currently considered a realistic goal, any comprehensive adaptation to effects of climate change must also consider livestock.

The observed adverse impacts on livestock production include increased heat stress in all but the coldest nations. This causes both mass animal mortality during heatwaves, and the sublethal impacts, such as lower quantity of quality of products like milk, greater vulnerability to conditions like lameness or even impaired reproduction. Another impact concerns reduced quantity or quality of animal feed, whether due to drought or as a secondary impact of CO2 fertilization effect. Difficulties with growing feed could reduce worldwide livestock headcounts by 7–10% by midcentury. Animal parasites and vector-borne diseases are also spreading further than they had before, and the data indicating this is frequently of superior quality to one used to estimate impacts on the spread of human pathogens.

While some areas which currently support livestock animals are expected to avoid "extreme heat stress" even with high warming at the end of the century, others may stop being suitable as early as midcentury. In general, sub-Saharan Africa is considered to be the most vulnerable region to food security shocks caused by the impacts of climate change on their livestock, as over 180 million people across those nations are expected to see significant declines in suitability of their rangelands around midcentury. On the other hand, Japan, the United States and nations in Europe are considered the least vulnerable. This is as much a product of pre-existing differences in human development index and other measures of national resilience and widely varying importance of pastoralism to the national diet as it is an outcome of direct impacts of climate on each country.

Proposed adaptations to climate change in livestock production include improved cooling at animal shelters and changes to animal feed, though they are often costly or have only limited effects. At the same time, livestock produces the majority of greenhouse gas emissions from agriculture and demands around 30% of agricultural fresh water needs, while only supplying 18% of the global calorie intake. Animal-derived food plays a larger role in meeting human protein needs, yet is still a minority of supply at 39%, with crops providing the rest. Consequently, plans for limiting global warming to lower levels like 1.5 °C (2.7 °F) or 2 °C (3.6 °F) assume animal-derived food will play a lower role in the global diets relative to now. As such, net zero transition plans now involve limits on total livestock headcounts (including reductions of already disproportionately large stocks in countries like Ireland), and there have been calls for phasing out subsidies currently offered to livestock farmers in many places worldwide.

== Heat stress in livestock ==
=== Projected worldwide increases ===
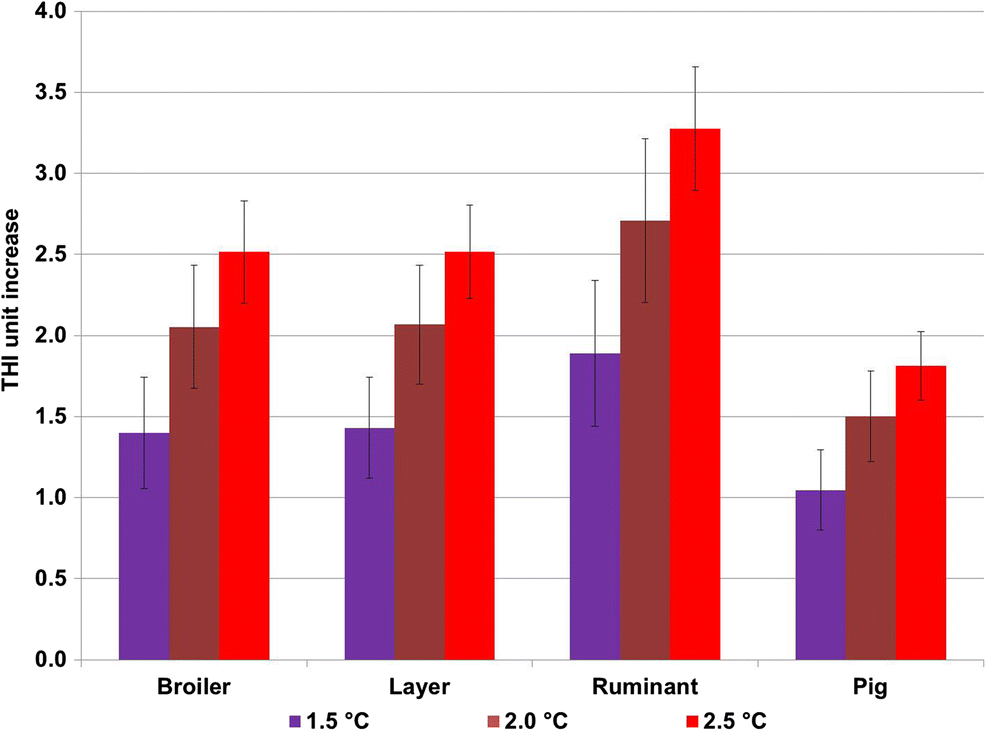
Increased intensity of global climate change causes even greater increases of thermal heat index in Jamaican farm animals. High thermal heat index is one of the more widely used indicators of heat stress.

In general, the preferred ambient temperature range for domestic animals is between 10 and 30 °C (50 and 86 °F). Much like how climate change is expected to increase overall thermal comfort for humans living in the colder regions of the world, livestock in those places would also benefit from warmer winters. Across the entire world, however, increasing summertime temperatures as well as more frequent and intense heatwaves will have clearly negative effects, substantially elevating the risk of livestock suffering from heat stress. Under the climate change scenario of highest emissions and greatest warming, SSP5-8.5, "cattle, sheep, goats, pigs and poultry in the low latitudes will face 72–136 additional days per year of extreme stress from high heat and humidity".

In Jamaica, considered representative of the Caribbean region, all livestock animals besides layer hens are already exposed to "very severe" heat stress in the present climate, with pigs being exposed to it at least once per day during the 5 summer and early autumn months, while ruminants and broilers only avoid daily exposure to very severe heat stress during the winter. it has been projected that even at 1.5 °C (2.7 °F) of global warming, "very severe" heat stress would become a daily event for ruminants and broilers. By 2 °C (3.6 °F), it would be felt for a longer duration, and extensive cooling systems would likely become a necessity for livestock production in the Caribbean. At 2.5 °C (4.5 °F), only layer hens would avoid daily exposure to "very severe" heat stress during the winter months.

Studies of heat stress and livestock had historically focused on cattle, as they are often kept outdoors and so are immediately exposed to changes in climate. On the other hand, a little over 50% of all pork production and 70% of all poultry production worldwide originated from animals kept entirely in confined buildings even around 2006, and the raw numbers were expected to increase by 3–3.5 times for pigs, by 2–2.4 times for layer hens and 4.4–5 times for broilers. Historically, livestock in these conditions were considered less vulnerable to warming than the animals in outdoor areas due to inhabiting insulated buildings, where ventilation systems are used to control the climate and relieve the excess heat. However, in the historically cooler midlatitude regions, indoor temperatures were already higher than the outdoor temperatures even in summer, and as the increased heating exceeds these systems' specifications, confined animals are left more vulnerable to the heat than those kept outdoors.

=== Health impacts of heat stress ===
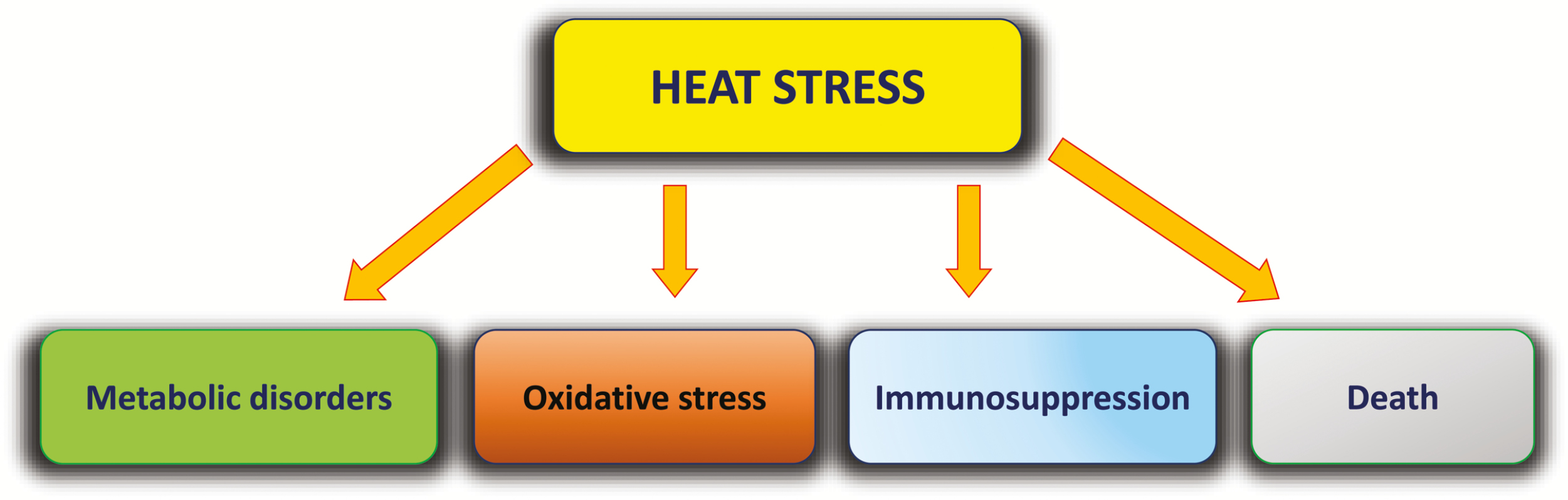
Impacts of heat stress on livestock animals

Once the body temperature of livestock animals is 3–4 °C (5.4–7.2 °F) above normal, this soon leads to "heat stroke, heat exhaustion, heat syncope, heat cramps, and ultimately organ dysfunction". Livestock mortality rates are already known to be higher during the hottest months of the year, as well as during heatwaves. During the 2003 European heat wave, for instance, thousands of pigs, poultry, and rabbits died in the French regions of Brittany and Pays-de-la-Loire alone.

Livestock can also suffer multiple sublethal impacts from heat stress, such as reduced milk production. Once the temperatures exceed 30 °C (86 °F), cattle, sheep, goats, pigs and chickens all begin to consume 3–5% less feed for each subsequent degree of temperature increase. At the same time, they increase respiratory and sweating rates, and the combination of these responses can lead to metabolic disorders. One examples is ketosis, or the rapid accumulation of ketone bodies, caused by the animal's body rapidly catabolizing its fat stores to sustain itself. Heat stress also causes an increase in antioxidant enzyme activities, which can result in an imbalance of oxidant and antioxidant molecules, otherwise known as oxidative stress. Feed supplementation with antioxidants like chromium can help address oxidative stress and prevent it from leading to other pathological conditions, but only in a limited way.

The immune system is also known to be impaired in heat-stressed animals, rendering them more susceptible to various infections. Similarly, vaccination of livestock is less effective when they suffer from heat stress. So far, heat stress had been estimated by researchers using inconsistent definitions, and current livestock models have limited correlation with experimental data. Notably, since livestock like cows spend much of their day laying down, comprehensive heat stress estimation needs to take account of ground temperature as well, but the first model to do so was only published in 2021, and it still tends to systematically overestimate body temperature while underestimating breathing rate.

=== Economic impact and adaptation ===
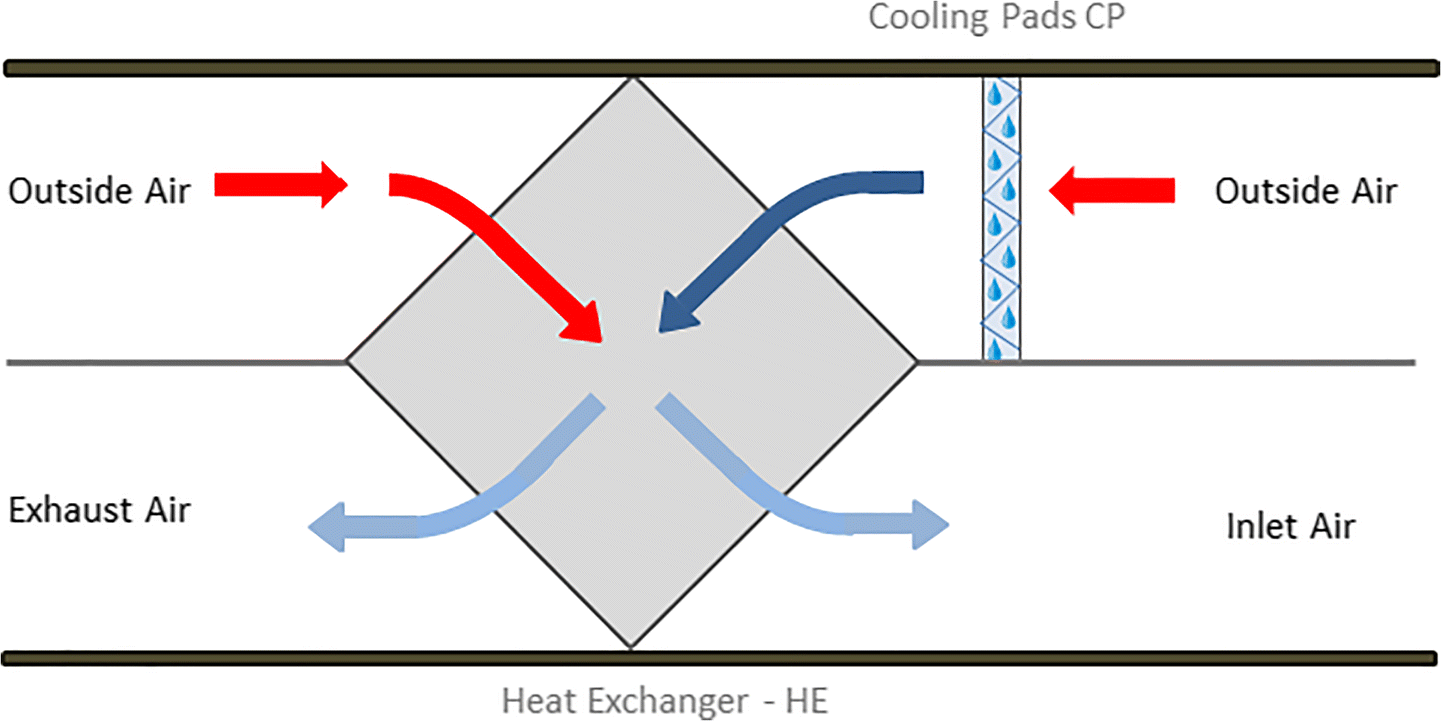
This diagram shows a proposed design of a heat exchanger for indoor rearing facilities, whose installation would help to protect livestock from heat stress.

In the United States alone, economic losses caused by heat stress in livestock were already valued at between $1.69 and $2.36 billion in 2003, with the spread reflecting different assumptions about the effectiveness of contemporary adaptation measures. Nevertheless, some reviews consider the United States to be the least vulnerable nation to food security shocks caused by the negative impacts of climate change on livestock, as while it rates in the middle of the pack in terms of exposure of its livestock and the societal sensitivity to that exposure, it has the highest adaptive capacity in the world due to its GDP and development status. Japan and the nations in Europe have low vulnerability for similar reasons.

Meanwhile the exposure of Mongolian livestock to climate change is not very different from that of American livestock, but the enormous importance of pastoralism in Mongolian society and its limited capacity to adapt still renders it one of the most vulnerable countries in the world. Nations in sub-Saharan Africa generally suffer from high exposure, low adaptive capacity and high sensitivity due to the importance of livestock in their societies, with these factors particularly acute in Eastern African countries, where between 4 and 19% of livestock-producing areas are expected to suffer "significantly" more "dangerous" heat stress events after 2070, depending on the climate change scenario. There is high confidence that under the most intense scenario, SSP5-8.5, the net amount of land which can support livestock will decline by 2050 as heat stress would already become unbearable for them in some locations.

A range of climate change adaptation measures can help to protect livestock, such as increasing access to drinking water, creating better shelters for animals kept outdoors and improving air circulation in the existing indoor facilities. Installing specialized cooling systems is the most capital-intensive intervention, but it may be able to completely counteract the impact of future warming.

== Difficulties in feeding livestock ==
=== Climatic impacts on feed and forage ===
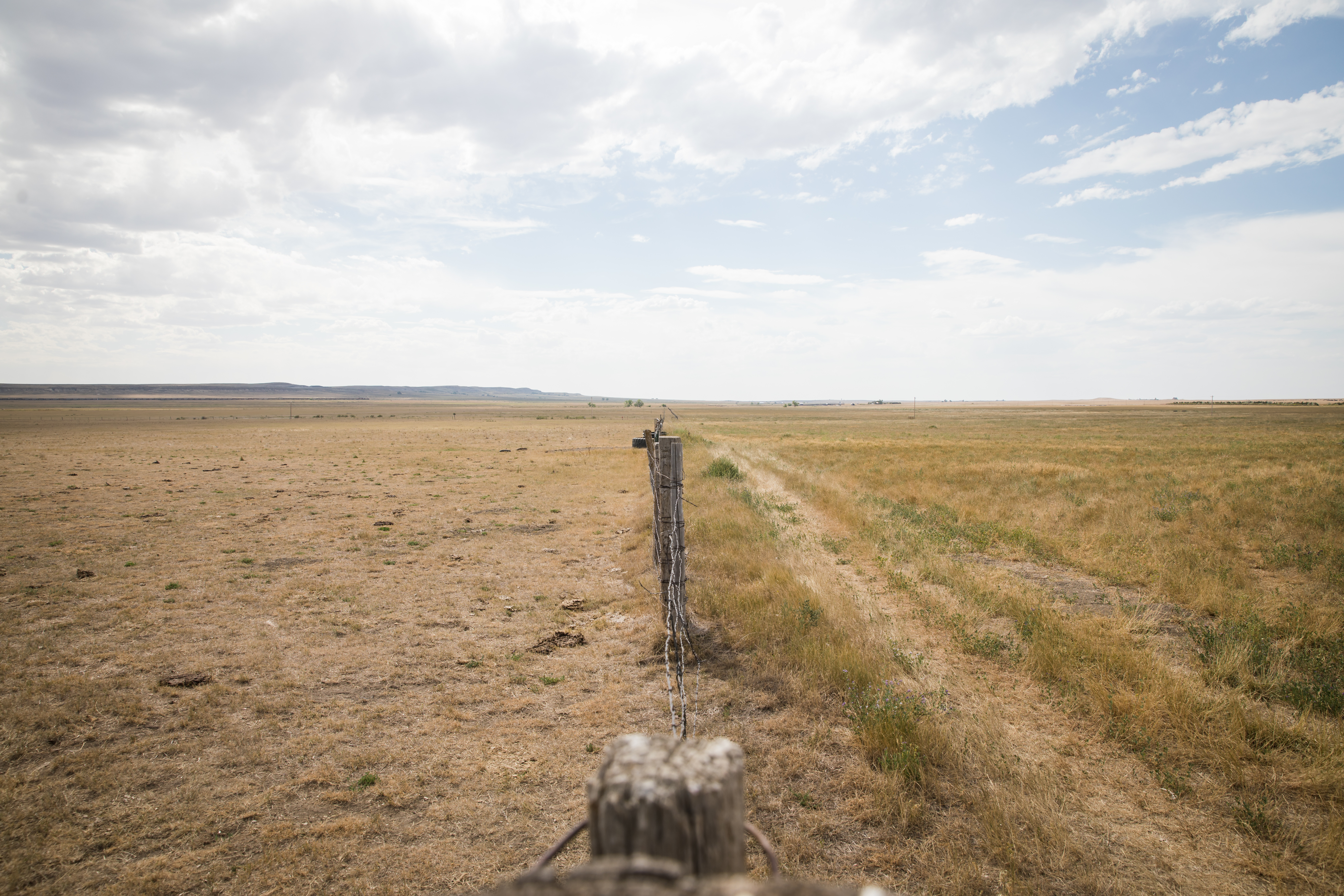
Overgrazed vs. stable pasture in Fall River County, South Dakota

Livestock is fed either by letting them directly graze forage from pasture, or by growing crops like corn or soybeans for fodder. Both are highly important; the majority of soybeans are grown for fodder, while a third of croplands worldwide are devoted to forage, which feeds around 1.5 billion cattle, 0.21 billion buffalo, 1.2 billion sheep and 1.02 billion goats. Insufficient supply or quality of either leads to a decrease in growth and reproductive efficiency in domestic animals, especially in conjunction with the other stressors, and at worst, may increase mortality due to starvation.

This is a particularly acute issue when livestock herds are already of an unsustainable size. For instance, two-thirds of animal feed requirements in Iran come from its rangelands, which cover around 52% of its land area, yet only 10% have forage quality above "medium" or "poor". Consequently, Iranian rangelands support over twice their sustainable capacity, and this leads to mass mortality in poor years, such as when around 800,000 goats and sheep in Iran perished due to the severe 1999 − 2001 drought. This was then exceeded by millions of animal deaths during the 2007–2008 drought.

Climate change can impact livestock animals' food supply in multiple ways. First, the direct effects of temperature increase affect both fodder cultivation and productivity of rangelands, albeit in variable ways. On a global scale, there is confidence that with all else equal, every single 1 °C (1.8 °F) of warming would decrease the yields of the four most important crops by between ~3% for rice and soybean (a crop grown primarily for animal feed) and up to 6% and 7.4% for wheat and corn respectively.

This global decline is dominated by negative impacts in already warm countries, since agriculture in cooler countries is expected to benefit from warming. This does not include the impact of changes in water availability, which can be far more important than the warming, whether for pasture species like alfalfa and tall fescue, or for crops. Some studies suggest that high water availability through irrigation "decouples" crops from climate as they become much less susceptible to extreme weather events, but the feasibility of this approach is obviously limited by the region's overall water security, especially once the warming reaches levels of 2 or 3 °C (3.6 or 5.4 °F).

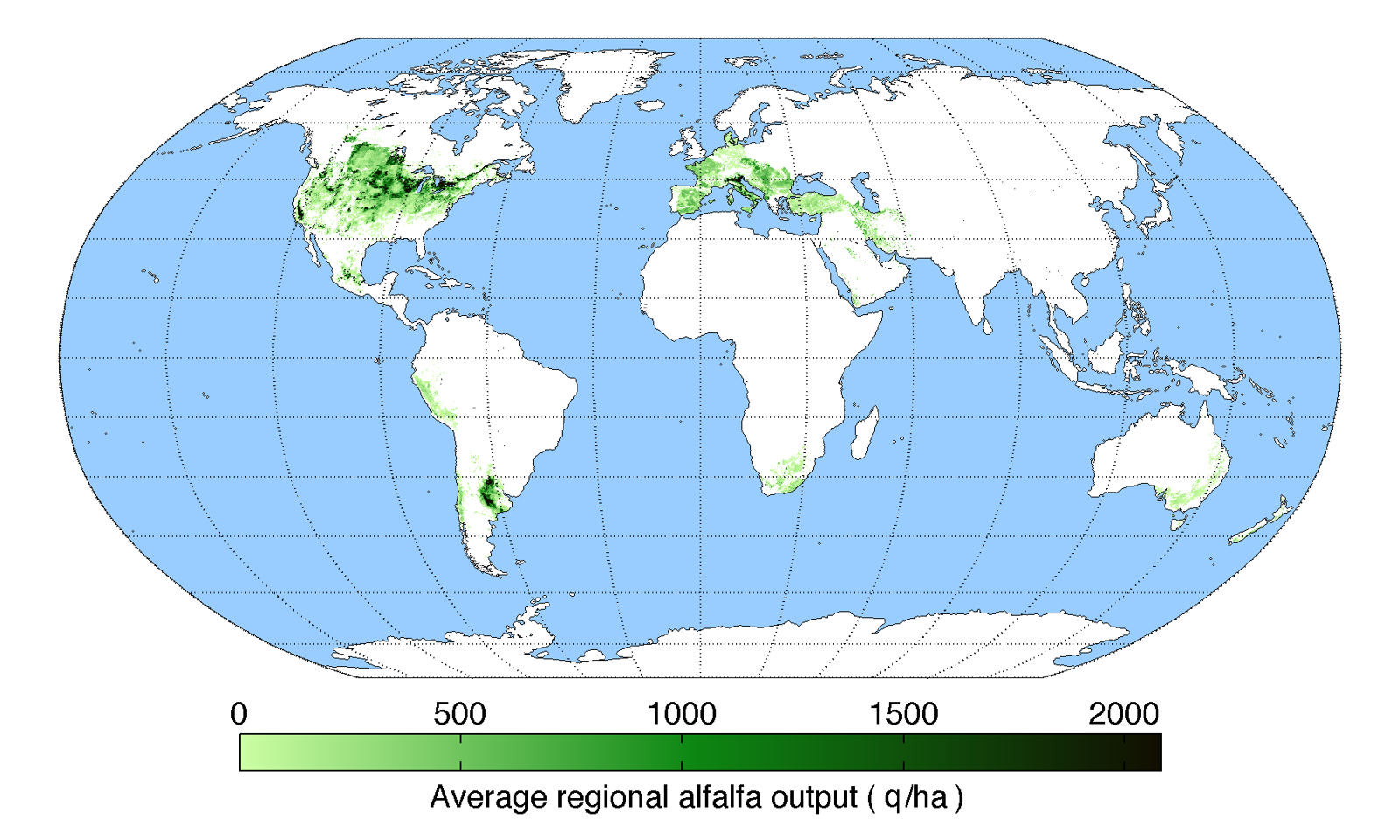
A map of alfalfa production, an important fodder plant

While climate change increases precipitation on average, regional changes are more variable, and variability alone adversely impacts "animal fertility, mortality, and herd recovery, reducing livestock keepers' resilience". In Zimbabwe, uncertainty about rainfall under different climate change scenarios could mean the difference between 20% and 100% of farmers negatively affected by 2070, while the average livestock revenue could potentially increase by 6%, yet may also plunge by as much as 43%.

Many places are likely to see increased drought, which would affect both the crops and the pastoral land. For instance, in the Mediterranean region, forage yields have already declined by 52.8% during drought years. Drought can also affect freshwater sources used by people and livestock alike: 2019 drought in Southwestern China caused around 824,000 people and 566,000 livestock to experience severe water scarcity, as over 100 rivers and 180 reservoirs dried out. That event was considered between 1.4 and 6 times more likely to happen as the result of climate change. In the mountain regions, glacier melt can also affect pasture, as it first floods the land, and then retreats entirely.

=== Atmospheric CO_{2} and livestock forage ===
The abundance of fodder and forage strongly benefits from the CO2 fertilization effect, which boosts growth and makes their water usage more efficient, potentially counteracting the effects of drought in certain places (i.e. many of the United States' rangelands). At the same time, it also causes plants' nutritional value to decline, with some forage grasses potentially becoming useless to livestock under certain conditions (i.e. during autumn, when their nutrition is already poor).

On mixed grass prairies, experimental local warming of 1.5 °C (2.7 °F) during the day and of 3 °C (5.4 °F) at night has a relatively minor effect in comparison to increasing CO_{2} levels to 600 ppm (nearly 50% larger than the ~420 ppm levels of 2023) during the same experiment. 96% of overall forage growth on such prairies stems from just six plant species, and they become 38% more productive largely in response to the increased CO_{2} levels, yet their nutritious value to livestock also declines by 13% due to the same, as they grow less edible tissue and become harder to digest.

Warming and water deficit also affect nutritional value, sometimes synergistically. For instance, Guinea grass, an important forage plant in the tropics, already gains more inedible lignin in response to water deficit (+43%), as well as in response to warming (+25%). Its lignin content increases the least in response to both stressors (+17%), yet elevated CO_{2} further reduces its nutritional value, even as it makes the plant less susceptible to water stress. Similar response was observed in Stylosanthes capilata, another important forage species in the tropics, which is likely to become more prevalent with warming, yet which may require irrigation to avoid substantial losses in nutritional value.

=== Global impacts of lowered livestock nutrition ===
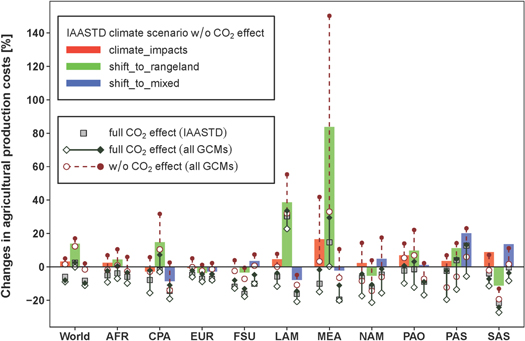
Impacts of one possible scenario of climate change on agricultural costs between 2005 and 2045, under a range of assumptions about the role of CO_{2} fertilization effect and the effectiveness of adaptation strategies.

Altogether, around 10% of current global pasture is expected to be threatened by water scarcity caused by climate change, as early as 2050. By 2100, 30% of the current combined crop and livestock areas would become climatically unsuitable under the warmest scenario SSP5-8.5, as opposed to 8% under the low-warming SSP1-2.6, although neither figure accounts for the potential shift of production to other areas. If 2 °C (3.6 °F) of warming occurs by 2050, then 7–10% of the current livestock are predicted to be lost primarily due to insufficient feed supply, amounting to $10–13 billion in lost value.

Similarly, an older study found that if 1.1 °C (2.0 °F) of warming occurs between 2005 and 2045 (rate comparable to hitting 2 °C (3.6 °F) by 2050), then under the current livestock management paradigm, global agricultural costs would increase by 3% (an estimated $145 billion), with the impact concentrated in pure pasturalist systems. At the same time, mixed crop-livestock systems already produced over 90% of the global milk supply as of 2013, as well as 80% of ruminant meat, yet they would bear the minority of the costs, and switching all pure livestock systems to mixed crop-livestock would decrease global agricultural costs from 3% to 0.3%, while switching half of those systems would reduce costs to 0.8%. The full shift would also reduce future projected deforestation in the tropics by up to 76 million ha.

== Pathogens and parasites ==
While climate-induced heat stress can directly reduce domestic animals' immunity against all diseases, climatic factors also impact the distribution of many livestock pathogens themselves. For instance, Rift Valley fever outbreaks in East Africa are known to be more intense during the times of drought or when there is an El Nino. Another example is that of helminths in Europe which have now spread further towards the poles, with higher survival rate and higher reproductive capacity (fecundity). Detailed long-term records of both livestock diseases and various agricultural interventions in Europe mean that demonstrating the role of climate change in the increased helminth burden in livestock is actually easier than attributing the impact of climate change on diseases which affect humans.

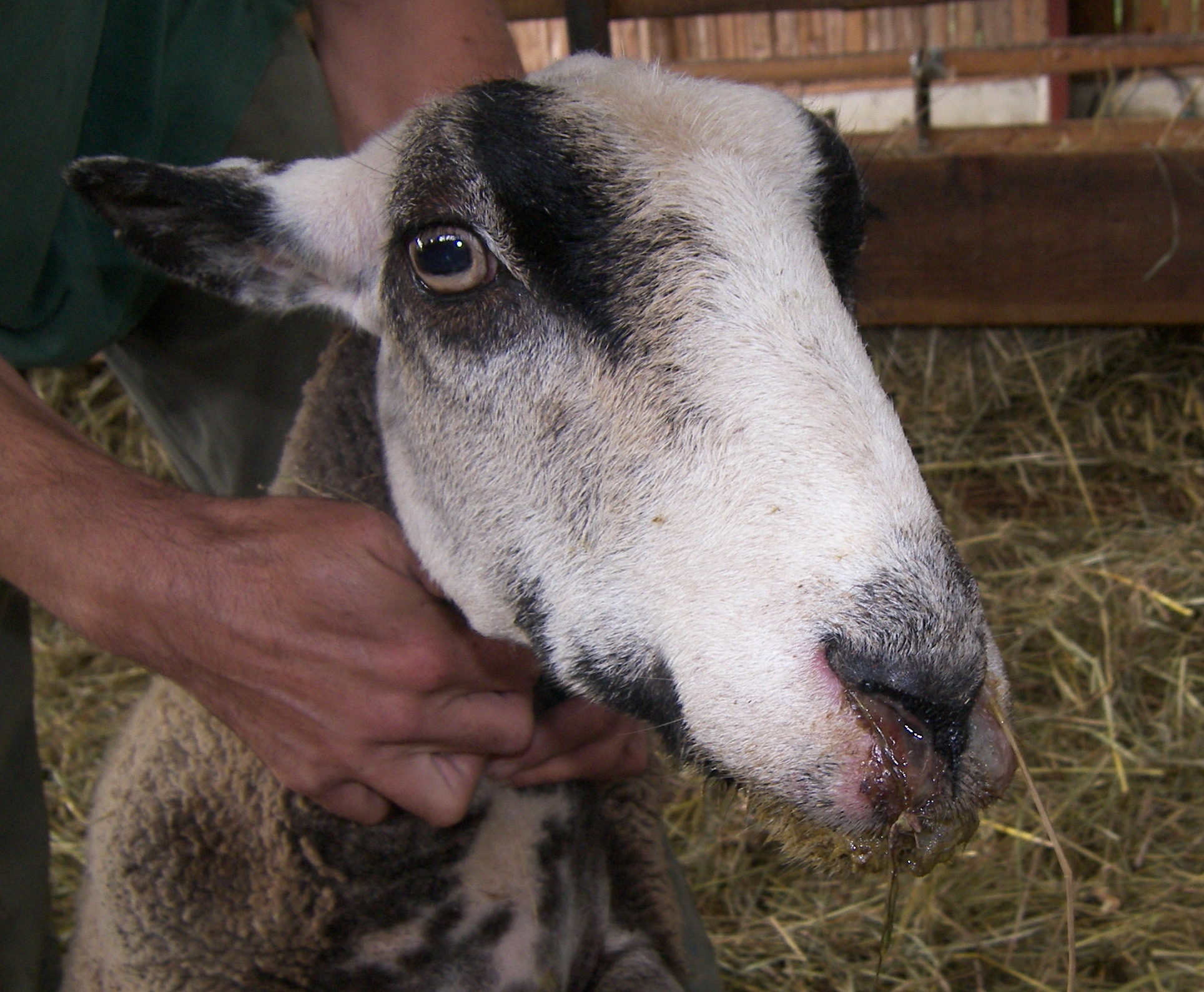
A sheep infected with bluetongue virus

Temperature increases are also likely to benefit Culicoides imicola, a species of midge which spreads bluetongue virus. Without a significant improvement in epidemiological control measures, what is currently considered an once-in-20-years outbreak of bluetongue would occur as frequently as once in five or seven years by midcentury under all but the most optimistic warming scenario. Rift Valley Fever outbreaks in East African livestock are also expected to increase. Ixodes ricinus, a tick which spreads pathogens like Lyme disease and tick-borne encephalitis, is predicted to become 5–7% more prevalent on livestock farms in Great Britain, depending on the extent of future climate change.

The impacts of climate change on leptospirosis are more complicated: its outbreaks are likely to worsen wherever flood risk increases, yet the increasing temperatures are projected to reduce its overall incidence in the Southeast Asia, particularly under the high-warming scenarios. Tsetse flies, the hosts of trypanosoma parasites, already appear to be losing habitat and thus affect a smaller area than before.

== By type of livestock ==
=== Aquaculture ===
Under high warming, there will be a global decline in area suitable for shellfish aquaculture after 2060. It will be preceded by regional declines in Asia. Farmed fish can be affected by heat stress as much as any other animal, and there has already been research on its effects and ways to mitigate it in species like tambaqui or blunt snout bream.

=== Camels ===
Along with camels, goats are more resilient to drought than cattle. In Southeastern Ethiopia, some of the cattle pastoralists are already switching to goats and camels.

=== Cattle ===
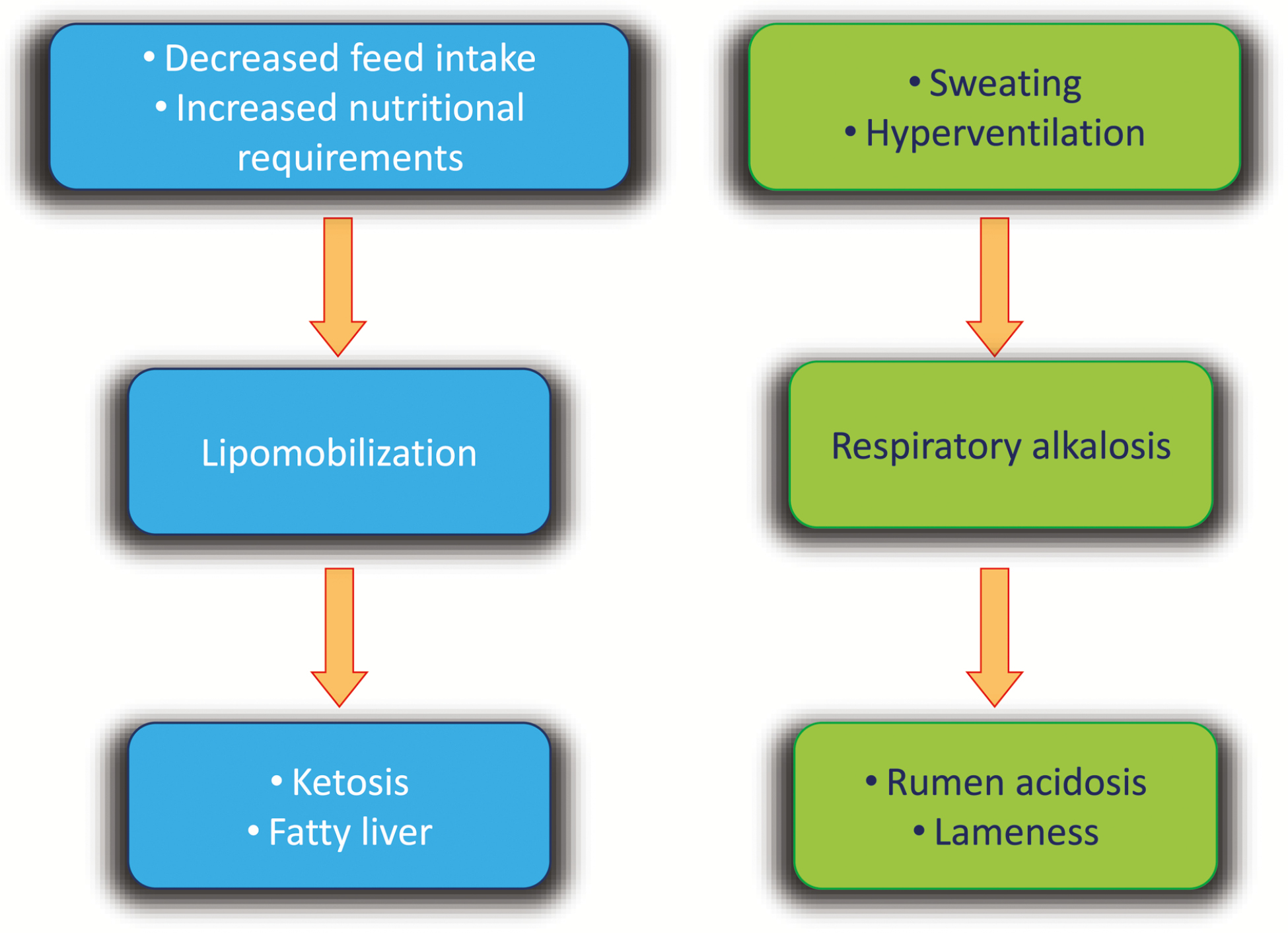
Pathologies which can be caused by heat stress, many specific to cattle

In 2009, there were 1.2 billion cattle in the world, with around 82% in the developing countries. The number has increased since then, with the 2021 figure at 1.53 billion. In 2020, it was found that in a current Eastern Mediterranean climate, cattle experience mild heat stress inside unadapted stalls for nearly half a year (159 days). Moderate heat stress is felt indoors and outdoors during May, June, July, August, September, and October. June and August are the months where cattle are exposed to severe heat stress outside, which is mitigated to moderate heat stress indoors.

Even mild heat stress can reduce the yield of cow milk: research in Sweden found that average daily temperatures of 20–25 °C (68–77 °F) reduce daily milk yield per cow by 200 g (0.44 lb), with the loss reaching 540 g (1.19 lb) for 25–30 °C (77–86 °F).

Research in a humid tropical climate describes a more linear relationship, with every unit of heat stress reducing yield by 2.13%. In the intensive farming systems, daily milk yield per cow declines by 1.8 kg (4.0 lb) during severe heat stress. In organic farming systems, the effect of heat stress on milk yields is limited, but milk quality suffers substantially, with lower fat and protein content.

In China, daily milk production per cow is already lower than the average by between 0.7 and 4 kg (1.5 and 8.8 lb) in July, the hottest month of the year. By 2070, it may decline by up to 50% (or 7.2 kg (16 lb)) due to climate change. Some researchers suggest that the already recorded stagnation of dairy production in both China and West Africa can attributed to persistent increases in heat stress.

Heatwaves can also reduce milk yield, with particularly acute impacts if the heatwave lasts for four or more days, as at that point the cow's thermoregulation capacity is usually exhausted, and its core body temperature starts to increase. At worst, heatwaves can lead to mass mortality: in July 1995, over 4,000 cattle died in the mid-central United States heatwave. In 1999, over 5,000 cattle died during a heatwave in northeastern Nebraska. Studies suggest that Brahman cattle and its cross-breeds are more resistant to heat stress than the regular bos taurus breeds, but it is considered unlikely that even more heat-resistant cattle can be bred at a sufficient rate to keep up with the expected warming.

Both male and female cattle can have their reproduction impaired by heat stress. In males, severe heat can affect both spermatogenesis and the stored spermatozoa. It may take up to eight weeks for sperm to become viable again. In females, heat stress negatively affects conception rates as it impairs corpus luteum and thus ovarian function and oocyte quality. Even after conception, a pregnancy is less likely to be carried to term due to reduced endometrial function and uterine blood flow, leading to increased embryonic mortality and early fetal loss.

Calves born to heat-stressed cows typically have a below-average weight, and their weight and height remains below average even by the time they reach their first year, due to permanent changes in their metabolism. Heat-stressed cattle have also displayed reduced albumin secretion and liver enzyme activity. This is attributed to accelerated breakdown of adipose tissue by the liver, causing lipidosis.

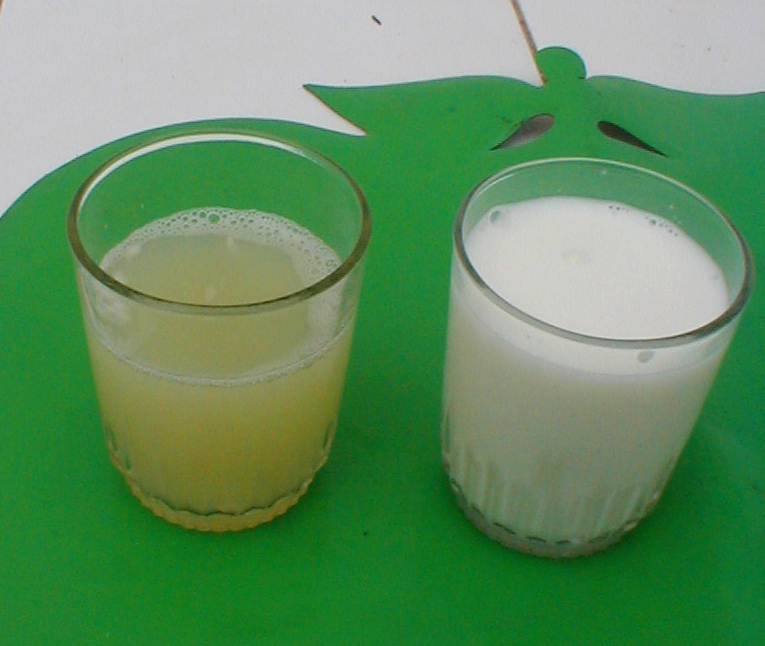
Serous exudate from an udder in E. coli mastitis in a cow (left), in comparison to normal milk (right)

Cattle are suspectible to some specific heat stress risks, such as ruminal acidosis. Cattle eat less when they experience acute heat stress during hottest parts of the day, only to compensate when it is cooler, and this disbalance soon causes acidosis, which can lead to laminitis. Additionally, one of the ways cattle can attempt to deal with higher temperatures is by panting more often, which rapidly decreases carbon dioxide concentrations and increases pH. To avoid respiratory alkalosis, cattle are forced to shed bicarbonate through urination, and this comes at the expense of rumen buffering.

These two pathologies can both develop into lameness, defined as "any foot abnormality that causes an animal to change the way that it walks". This effect can occur "weeks to months" after severe heat stress exposure, alongside sore ulcers and white line disease. Another specific risk is mastitis, normally caused by either an injury to cow's udder, or "immune response to bacterial invasion of the teat canal." Bovine neutrophil function is impaired at higher temperatures, leaving mammary glands more vulnerable to infection, and mastitis is already known to be more prevalent during the summer months, so there is an expectation this would worsen with continued climate change.

One of the vectors of bacteria which cause mastitis are Calliphora blowflies, whose numbers are predicted to increase with continued warming, especially in the temperate countries like the United Kingdom. Rhipicephalus microplus, a tick which primarily parasitises cattle, could become established in the currently temperate countries once their autumns and winters become warmer by about 2–2.75 °C (3.60–4.95 °F). On the other hand, the brown stomach worm, Ostertagia ostertagi, is predicted to become much less prevalent in cattle as the warming progresses.

By 2017, it was already reported that farmers in Nepal kept fewer cattle due to the losses imposed by a longer hot season. Cow-calf ranches in Southeast Wyoming are expected to suffer greater losses in the future as the hydrological cycle becomes more variable and affects forage growth. Even though the annual mean precipitation is not expected to change much, there will be more unusually dry years as well as unusually wet years, and the negatives will outweigh the positives. Keeping smaller herds to be more flexible when dry years hit was suggested as an adaptation strategy. Since more variable and therefore less predictable precipitation is one of the well-established effects of climate change on the water cycle, similar patterns were later established across the rest of the United States, and then globally.

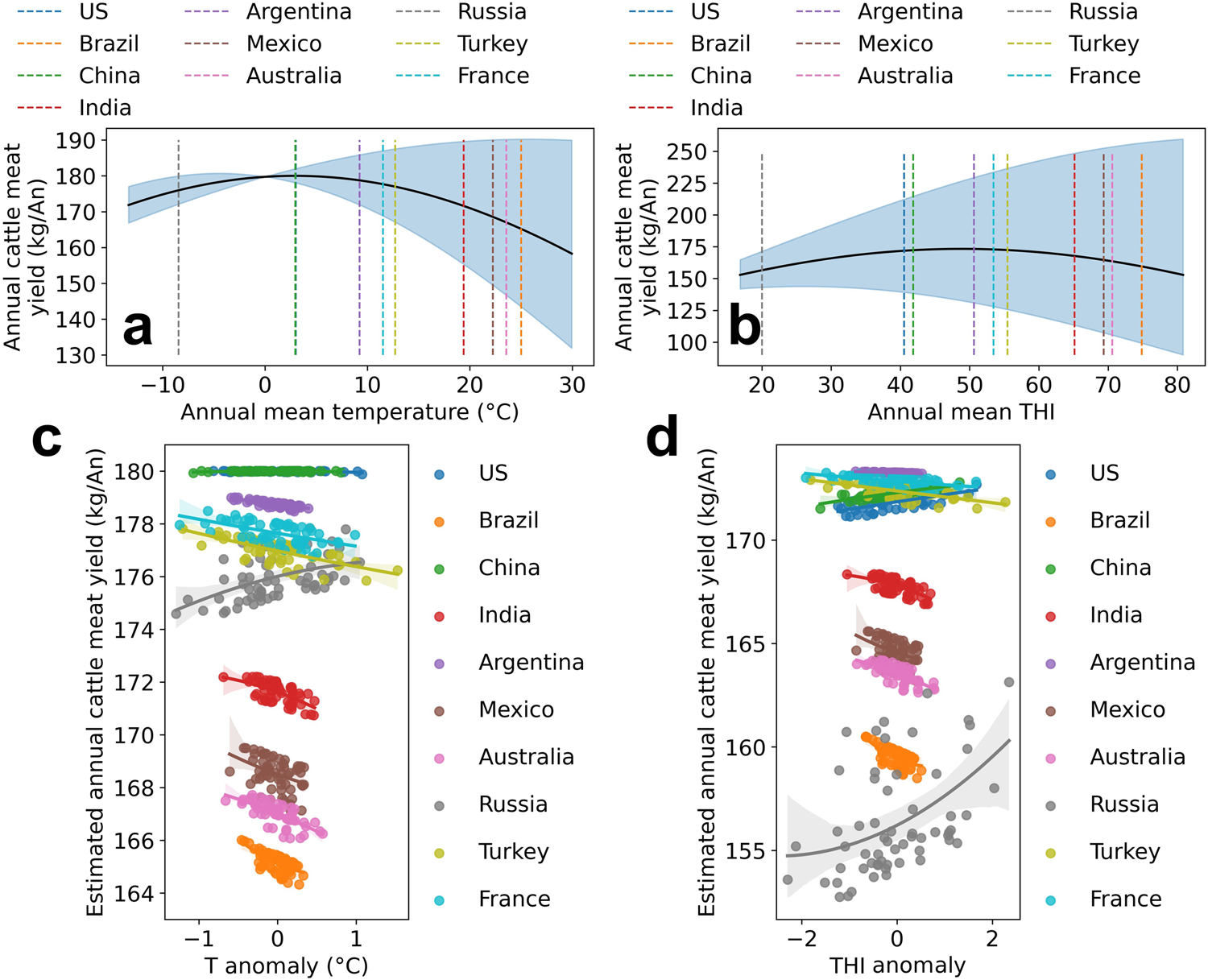
All but two or three of the top 10 beef-producing countries are likely to see lower production with greater warming.

As of 2022, it has been suggested that every additional millimeter of annual precipitation increases beef production by 2.1% in the tropical countries and reduces it by 1.9% in temperate ones, yet the effects of warming are much larger. Under SSP3-7.0, a scenario of significant warming and very low adaptation, every additional 1 °C (1.8 °F) would decrease global beef production by 9.7%, mainly because of its impact on tropical and poor countries. In the countries which can afford adaptation measures, production would fall by around 4%, but by 27% in those which cannot.

In 2024, another study suggested that the impacts would be milder - a 1% decrease per every additional 1 °C (1.8 °F) in low-income countries and 0.2% in high-income ones, and a 3.2% global decline in beef production by 2100 under SSP3-7.0. The same paper suggests that out of the top 10 beef-producing countries (Argentina, Australia, Brazil, China, France, India, Mexico, Russia, Turkey and the U.S.), only China, Russia and the U.S. would see overall production gains with increased warming, with the rest experiencing declines. Other research suggests that east and south of Argentina may become more suitable to cattle ranching due to climate-driven shifts in rainfall, but a shift to Zebu breeds would likely be needed to minimize the impact of warming.

=== Equines ===
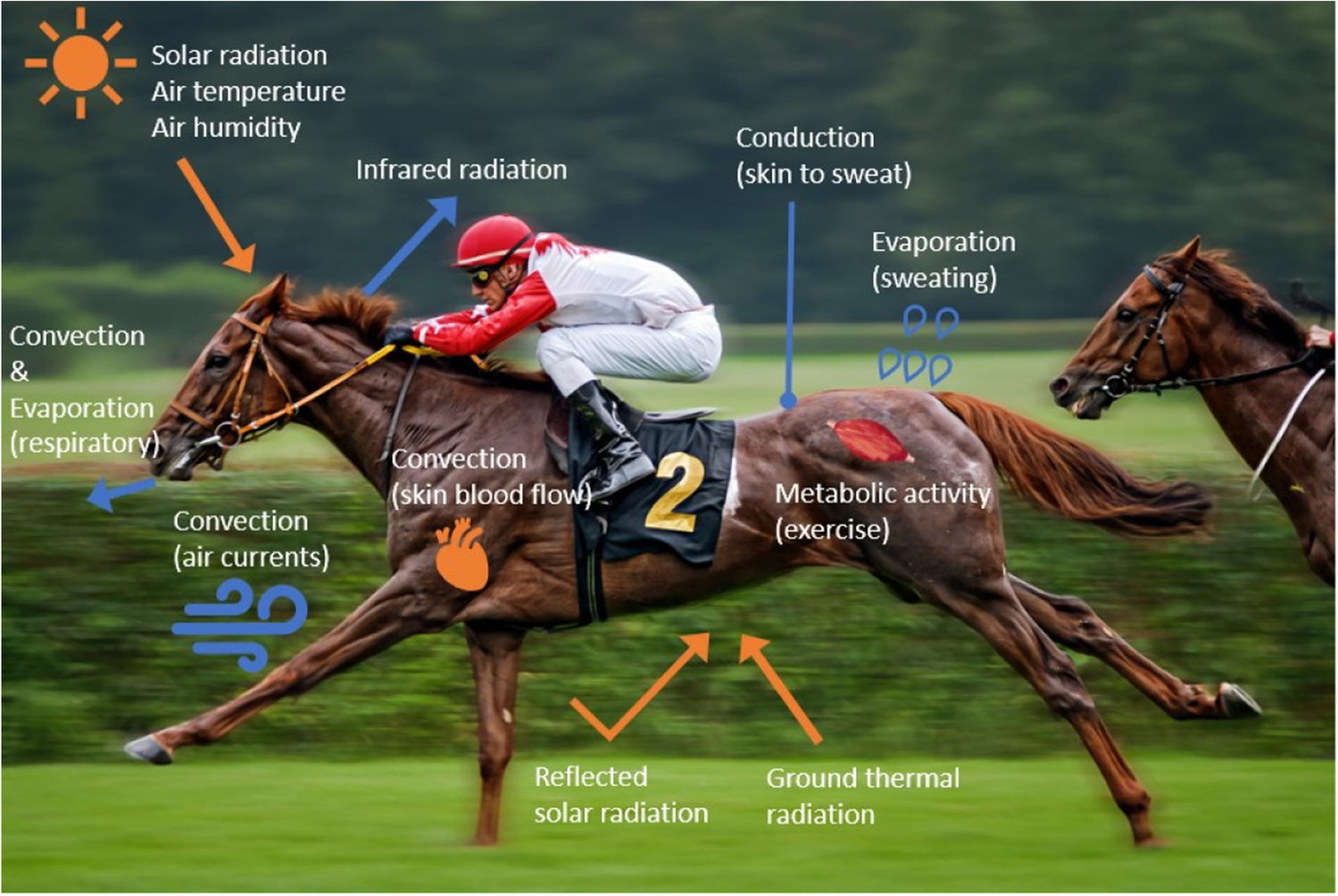
A diagram of heat regulation in horses

In 2019, there were around 17 million horses in the world. Healthy body temperature for adult horses is in the range between 37.5 and 38.5 °C (99.5 and 101.3 °F), which they can maintain while ambient temperatures are between 5 and 25 °C (41 and 77 °F). Strenuous exercise increases core body temperature by 1 °C (1.8 °F)/minute, as 80% of the energy used by equine muscles is released as heat. Along with bovines and primates, equines are one of the very few animal groups which use sweating as their primary method of thermoregulation. It can account for up to 70% of their heat loss, and horses sweat three times more than humans while undergoing comparably strenuous physical activity.

Unlike in humans, this sweat is created not by eccrine glands but by apocrine glands. In hot conditions, horses during three hours' moderate-intensity exercise can lose 30 to 35 L of water and 100 g of sodium, 198 g of choloride and 45 g of potassium. In another difference from humans, their sweat is hypertonic, and contains a protein called latherin, which enables it to spread across their body easier, and to foam, rather than to drip off.

These adaptations are partly to compensate for their lower body surface-to-mass ratio, which makes it more difficult for horses to passively radiate heat. Prolonged exposure to very hot or humid conditions will lead to consequences such as anhidrosis, heat stroke, or brain damage, potentially culminating in death if not addressed with measures like cold water applications. Around 10% of incidents associated with horse transport have been attributed to heat stress. These issues are expected to worsen in the future.

African horse sickness (AHS) is a viral illness with a mortality close to 90% in horses, and 50% in mules. A midge, Culicoides imicola, is the primary vector of AHS, and its spread is expected to benefit from climate change. The spillover of Hendra virus from its flying fox hosts to horses is also likely to increase, as future warming would expand the hosts' geographic range. It has been estimated that under the "moderate" and high climate change scenarios, RCP4.5 and RCP8.5, the number of threatened horses would increase by 110,000 and 165,000, respectively, or by 175 and 260%.

=== Goats and sheep ===
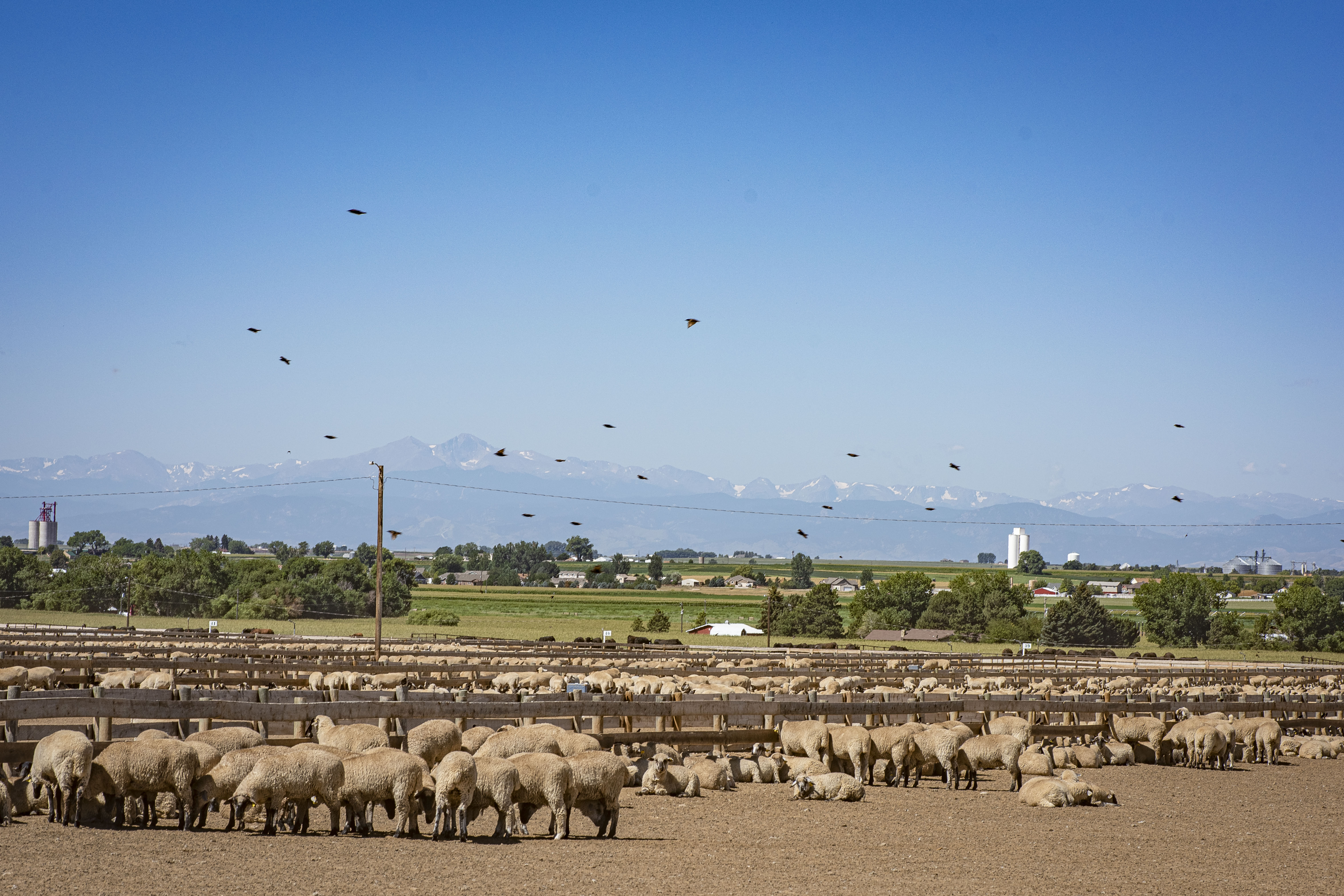
Sheep are known for tolerating heat better than cattle.

Goats and sheep are often collectively described as small ruminants, and tend to be studied together rather than separately. Both of them are known to be less affected by climate change than cattle, with goats in particular considered one the most climate-resilient domestic animals, being second only to camels. In Southeastern Ethiopia, some of the cattle pastoralists are already switching to goats and camels.

Even so, the 2007–2008 drought in Iran had already resulted in the country's sheep population declining by nearly 4 million – from 53.8 million in 2007 to 50 million in 2008, while the goat population declined from 25.5 million in 2007 to 22.3 million in 2008. Some researchers expect climate change to drive genetic selection towards more heat- and drought-adapted breeds of sheep. Notably, heat-adapted sheep can be of both wool and hair breeds, in spite of the popular perception that hair breeds are always more resistant to heat stress.

Parasitic worms Haemonchus contortus and Teladorsagia circumcincta are predicted to spread more easily amongst small ruminants as the winters become milder due to future warming, although in some places this is counteracted by summers getting hotter than their preferred temperature. Earlier, similar effects have been observed with two other parasitic worms, Parelaphostrongylus odocoilei and Protostrongylus stilesi, which have already been able to reproduce for a longer period inside sheep due to milder temperatures in the sub-Arctic.

=== Pigs ===
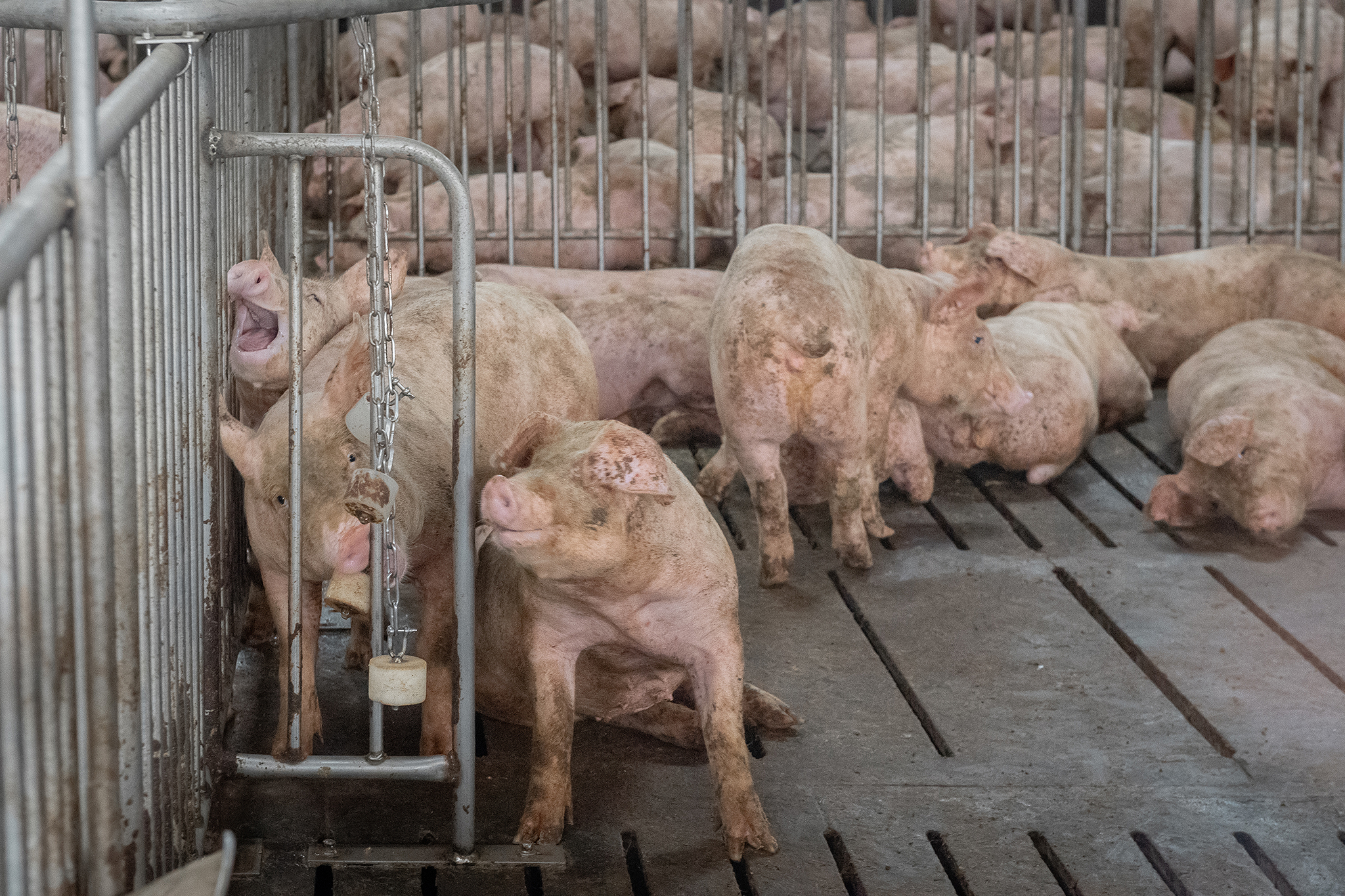
Pig farm in Taiwan, in 2020

For pigs, heat stress varies depending on their age and size. Young and growing pigs with the average body mass of 30 kg (66 lb) can tolerate temperatures up to 24 °C (75 °F) before starting to experience any heat stress, but after they have grown and are fattened to about 120 kg (260 lb), at which point they are considered ready for slaughter, their tolerance drops to just 20 °C (68 °F).

One paper estimated that in Austria, at an intensive farming facility used to fatten up about 1800 growing pigs at a time, the already observed warming between 1981 and 2017 would have increased relative annual heat stress by between 0.9 and 6.4% per year. It is considered representative of other such facilities in Central Europe.

A follow-up paper considered the impact of several adaptation measures. Installing a ground-coupled heat exchanger was the most effective intervention at addressing heat stress, reducing it by 90 to 100%. Two other cooling systems also showed substantial effectiveness: evaporative cooler pads made of wet cellulose reduced heat stress by 74 to 92%, although they also risked increasing wet bulb temperature stress as they necessarily moistened the air. Combining such pads with regenerative heat exchangers eliminated this issue, but also increased costs and reduced the effectiveness of the system to between 61% and 86%.

All three interventions were considered capable of completely buffering the future impact of climate change on heat stress over at least the next three decades, but installing them requires substantial start-up investments, and their impact on commercial viability of the facilities is unclear. Other interventions were considered unable to fully buffer the impact of warming, but they were also cheaper and simpler by comparison. They include doubling the ventilation capacity, and having the pigs rest during the day while feeding them at night when it is cooler: such a 10-hour shift would require that the facility only uses artificial light and switch to predominantly night shift work. Similarly, stocking fewer pigs per facility is the absolute simplest intervention, yet it has the lowest effectiveness, and necessarily reduces profitability.

=== Poultry ===
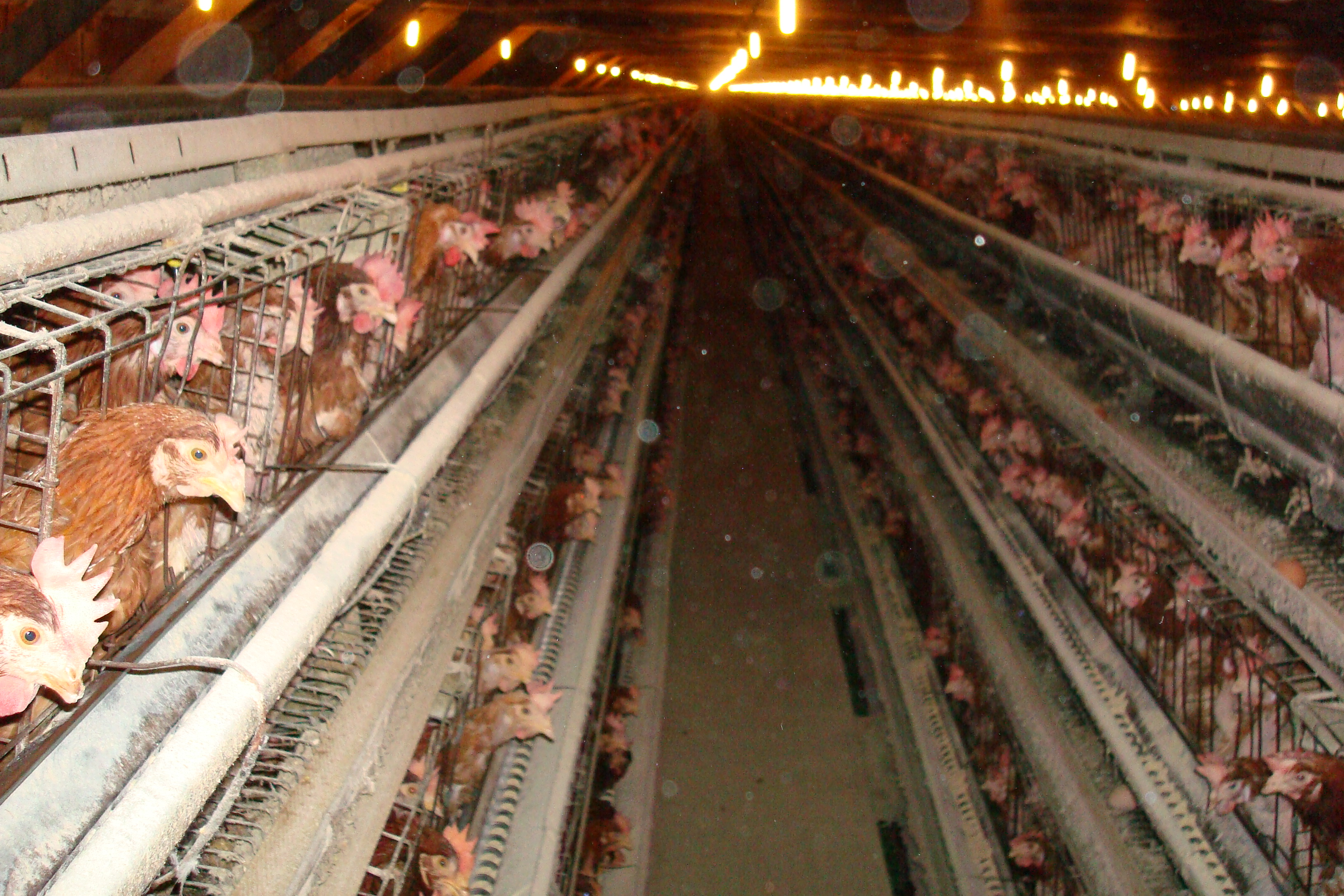
An egg farm in New England, 2009

It is believed that the thermal comfort zone for poultry is in the 18–25 °C (64–77 °F) range. Some papers describe 26–35 °C (79–95 °F) as the "critical zone" for heat stress, but others report that due to acclimatization, birds in the tropical countries do not begin to experience heat stress until 32 °C (90 °F). There is wider agreement that temperatures greater than 35 °C (95 °F) and 47 °C (117 °F) form "upper critical" and lethal zones, respectively.

Average daily temperatures of around 33 °C (91 °F) are known to interfere with feeding in both broilers and egg hens, as well as lower their immune response, with outcomes such as reduced weight gain/egg production or greater incidence of salmonella infections, footpad dermatitis or meningitis. Persistent heat stress leads to oxidative stress in tissues, and harvested white meat ends up with a lower proportion of essential compounds like vitamin E, lutein and zeaxanthin, yet an increase in glucose and cholesterol. Multiple studies show that dietary supplementation with chromium can help to relieve these issues due to its antioxidative properties, particularly in combination with zinc or herbs like wood sorrel.

Resveratrol is another popular antioxidant administered to poultry for these reasons. Though the effect of supplementation is limited, it is much cheaper than interventions to improve cooling or simply stock fewer birds, and so remains popular. While the majority of literature on poultry heat stress and dietary supplementation focuses on chickens, similar findings were seen in Japanese quails, which eat less and gain less weight, suffer reduced fertility and hatch eggs of worse quality under heat stress, and also seem to benefit from mineral supplementation.

Around 2003, it was estimated that the poultry industry in the United States already lost up to $165 million annually due to heat stress at the time. One paper estimated that if global warming reaches 2.5 °C (4.5 °F), then the cost of rearing broilers in Brazil increases by 35.8% at the least modernized farms and by 42.3% at farms with the medium level of technology used in livestock housing, while they increase the least at farms with the most advanced cooling technologies. On the contrary, if the warming is kept to 1.5 °C (2.7 °F), costs at moderately modernized farms increase the least, by 12.5%, followed by the most modernized farms with a 19.9% increase, and the least technological farms seeing the greatest increase.

=== Reindeer ===
By mid-2010s, indigenous people of the Arctic have already observed reindeer breeding less and surviving winters less often, as warmer temperatures benefit biting insects and result in more intense and persistent swarm attacks. They also become more susceptible to parasites spread by such insects, and as the Arctic becomes warmer and more accessible to invasive species, it is anticipated that they will come in contact with pests and pathogens they have not encountered historically.

== Greenhouse gas emissions from livestock activities ==
Livestock produces the majority of greenhouse gas emissions from agriculture and demands around 30% of agricultural freshwater needs, while only supplying 18% of the global calorie intake. Animal-derived food plays a larger role in meeting human protein needs, yet is still a minority of supply at 39%, with crops providing the rest.At the same time, livestock farming is affected by climate change.

Out of the Shared Socioeconomic Pathways used by the Intergovernmental Panel on Climate Change, only SSP1 offers any realistic possibility of meeting the 1.5 °C (2.7 °F) target. Together with measures like a massive deployment of green technology, this pathway assumes animal-derived food will play a lower role in global diets relative to now. As a result, there have been calls for phasing out subsidies currently offered to livestock farmers in many places worldwide, and net zero transition plans now involve limits on total livestock headcounts, including substantial reductions of existing stocks in some countries with extensive animal agriculture sectors like Ireland. Yet, an outright end to human consumption of meat and animal products is not currently considered a realistic goal. Therefore, any comprehensive plan of adaptation to the effects of climate change, particularly the present and future effects of climate change on agriculture, must also consider livestock.

Livestock activities also contribute disproportionately to land-use effects, since crops such as corn and alfalfa are cultivated to feed the animals.

In 2010, enteric fermentation accounted for 43% of the total greenhouse gas emissions from all agricultural activity in the world. The meat from ruminants has a higher carbon equivalent footprint than other meats or vegetarian sources of protein based on a global meta-analysis of lifecycle assessment studies. Small ruminants such as sheep and goats contribute approximately 475 million tons of carbon dioxide equivalent to GHG emissions, which constitutes around 6.5% of world agriculture sector emissions. Methane production by animals, principally ruminants, makes up an estimated 15-20% of global production of methane.

== See also ==
- Economic impacts of climate change
- Effects of climate change on agriculture
