= Greenhouse gas emissions from agriculture =

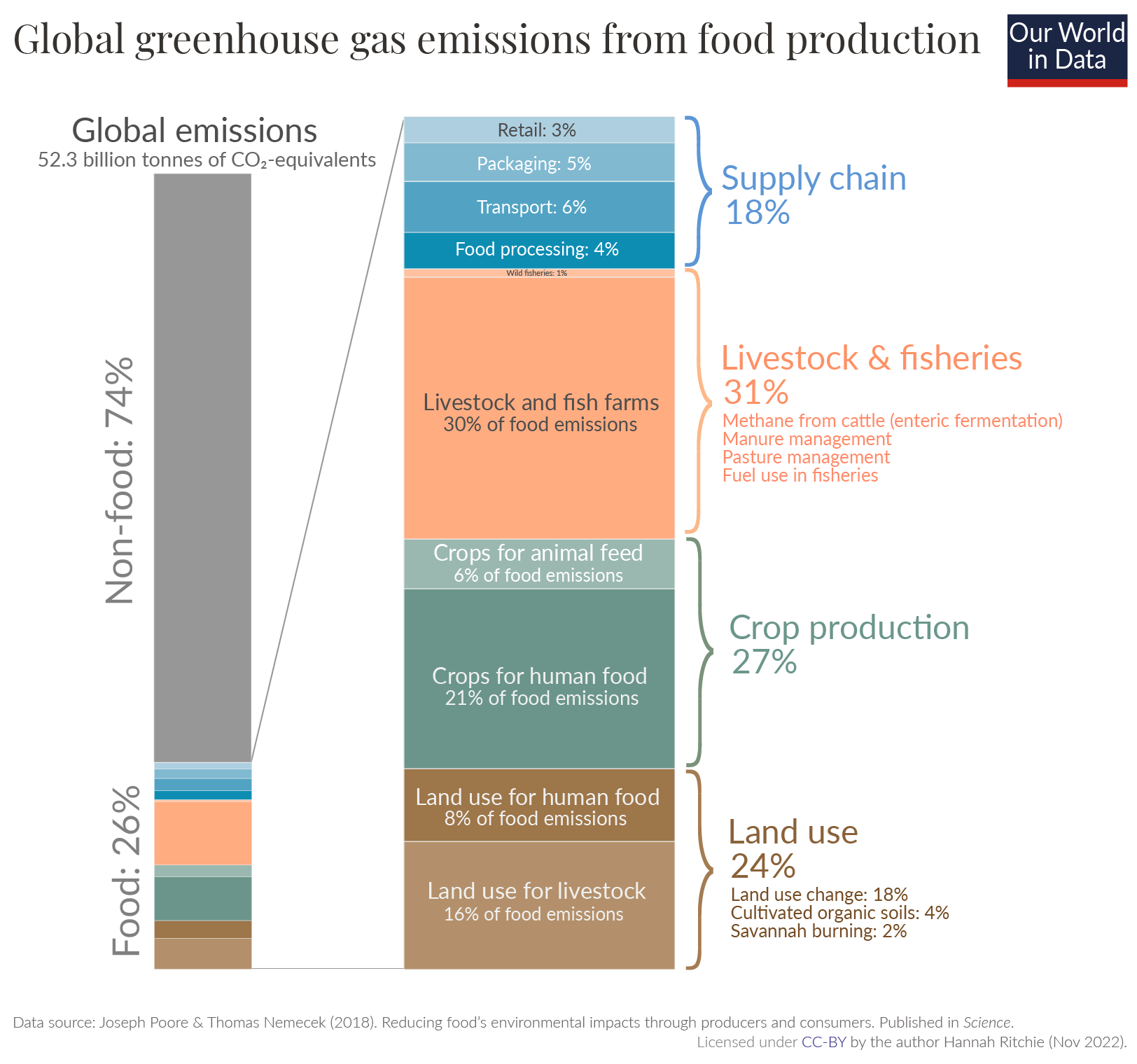
One quarter of the world's greenhouse gas emissions result from food and agriculture (data from 2019).

Greenhouse gas emissions from agriculture are large: the agriculture, forestry and land use sectors contribute between 13% and 21% of global greenhouse gas emissions. Direct greenhouse gas emissions include those from rice and livestock farming. Indirect emissions from the conversion of non-agricultural land such as forests into agricultural land are also very important. With regard to direct emissions, nitrous oxide and methane make up over half of total greenhouse gas emissions from agriculture. A 2023 review emphasizes that emissions from agricultural soils are shaped by factors such as soil type, climate, and management practices. It also highlights several mitigation strategies, including conservation tillage, precision agriculture, improved water use, and the application of biochar, that can reduce emissions and enhance soil carbon storage.

Furthermore, there is also fossil fuel consumption for transport and fertilizer production. For example, the manufacture and use of nitrogen fertilizer contribute around 5% of all global greenhouse gas emissions. Livestock farming is a major source of greenhouse gas emissions.

Farm animals' digestive systems can be put into two categories: monogastric and ruminant. Ruminant cattle for beef and dairy rank high in greenhouse gas emissions. In comparison, monogastric, or pigs and poultry-related foods, are lower. The consumption of the monogastric types may yield fewer emissions. Monogastric animals have a higher feed-conversion efficiency and also do not produce as much methane. Non-ruminant livestock, such as poultry, emit much less greenhouse gas.

There are many strategies to reduce greenhouse gas emissions from agriculture (this is one of the goals of climate-smart agriculture). Mitigation measures in the food system can be divided into four categories. These are demand-side changes, ecosystem protections, mitigation on farms, and mitigation in supply chains. On the demand side, limiting food waste is an effective way to reduce food emissions. Changes to a diet less reliant on animal products such as plant-based diets are also effective. This could include milk substitutes and meat alternatives. Several methods are also under investigation to reduce the greenhouse gas emissions from livestock farming. These include genetic selection, introduction of methanotrophic bacteria into the rumen, vaccines, feeds, diet modification and grazing management.

== Global estimates ==
World farm-gate greenhouse gas emissions by activity

Total emissions from agrifood systems in 2022 amounted to 16.2 billion tonnes of carbon dioxide equivalent (Gt CO2eq) of GHG released into the atmosphere, an increase of 10%, or 1.5 Gt CO2eq compared with 2000.

In 2020, it was estimated that the food system as a whole contributed 37% of total greenhouse gas emissions and that this figure was on course to increase by 30–40% by 2050 due to population growth and dietary change.

Between 2010 and 2019, agriculture, forestry and land use contributed between 13% and 21% to global greenhouse gas emissions. Nitrous oxide and methane make up over half of total greenhouse gas emissions from agriculture.

=== Older estimates ===
In 2010, agriculture, forestry and land-use change were estimated to contribute 20–25% of global annual emissions.

== Emissions by type of activity ==
=== Land use changes ===
Substantial land-use change contributions to emissions have been made by Latin America, Southeast Asia, Africa, and Pacific Islands. The area of rectangles shows the region's total emissions in 2019.

Agriculture contributes to greenhouse gas increases through land use in four main ways:

- CO_{2} releases linked to deforestation
- Methane releases from rice cultivation
- Methane releases from enteric fermentation in cattle
- Nitrous oxide releases from fertilizer application

Together, these agricultural processes comprise 54% of methane emissions, roughly 80% of nitrous oxide emissions, and virtually all carbon dioxide emissions tied to land use.

Land cover has changed substantially since 1750, as humans have deforested temperate regions. When forests and woodlands are cleared to make room for fields and pastures, the albedo of the affected area increases, which can result in either warming or cooling effects depending on local conditions. Deforestation also affects regional carbon reuptake, which can result in increased concentrations of CO_{2}, the dominant greenhouse gas. Land-clearing methods such as slash and burn compound these effects, as the burning of biomatter directly releases greenhouse gases and particulate matter such as soot into the air. Land clearing can destroy the soil carbon sponge. Although carbon accounting estimates the greenhouse gas increase when natural land is first farmed, it has been argued that the opportunity cost of land used inefficiently should also be counted to show the importance of agricultural productivity.

=== Livestock ===
Domesticated livestock constitute almost 60% of mammal biomass globally.

Meat from cattle and sheep has the highest emissions intensity of any agricultural commodity.

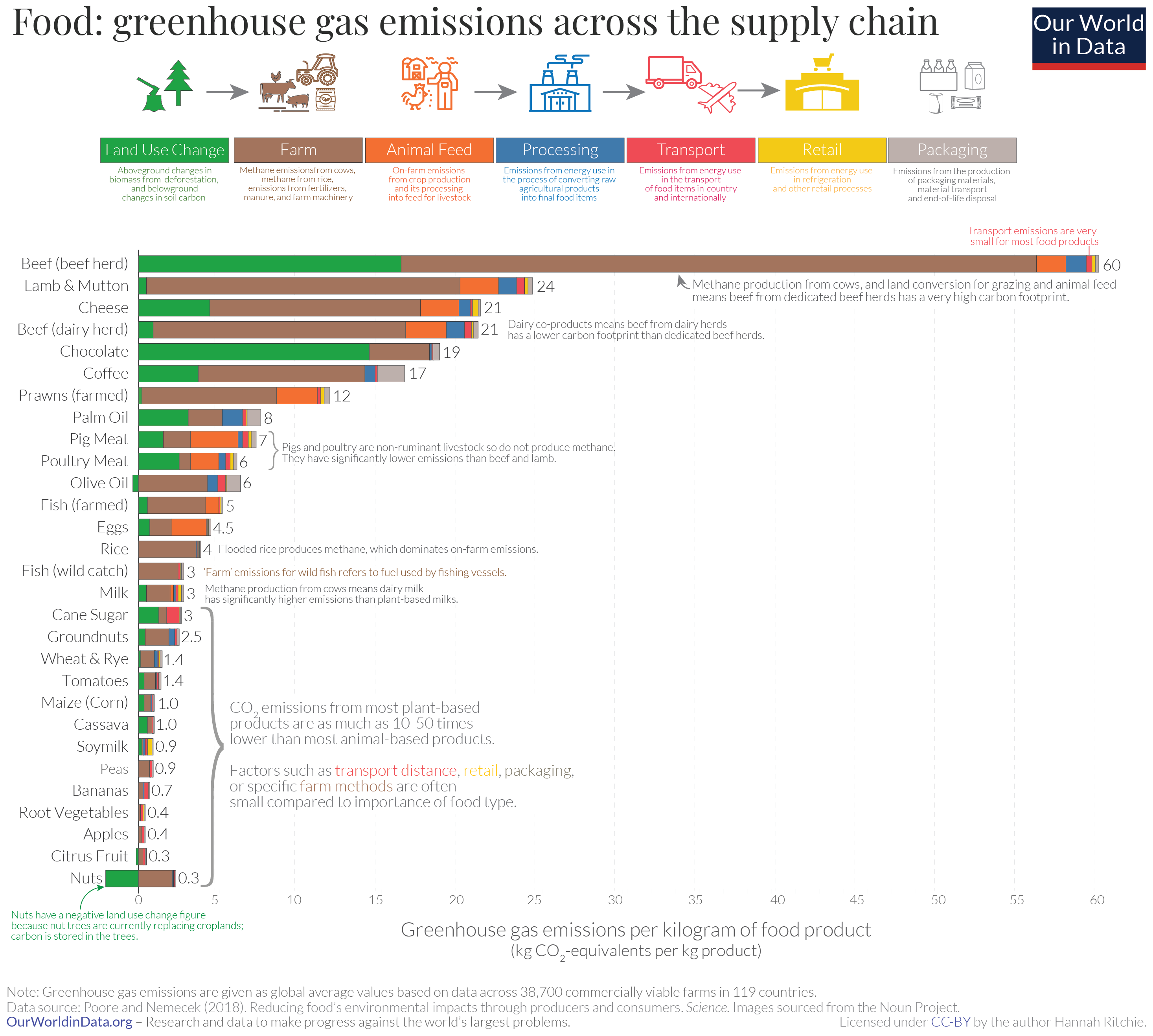
Greenhouse gas emissions across the supply chain for different foods

Livestock produces the majority of greenhouse gas emissions from agriculture and demands around 30% of agricultural freshwater needs, while only supplying 18% of the global calorie intake. Animal-derived food plays a larger role in meeting human protein needs, yet is still a minority of supply at 39%, with crops providing the rest.At the same time, livestock farming is affected by climate change.

Out of the Shared Socioeconomic Pathways used by the Intergovernmental Panel on Climate Change, only SSP1 offers any realistic possibility of meeting the 1.5 °C (2.7 °F) target. Together with measures like a massive deployment of green technology, this pathway assumes animal-derived food will play a lower role in global diets relative to now. As a result, there have been calls for phasing out subsidies currently offered to livestock farmers in many places worldwide, and net zero transition plans now involve limits on total livestock headcounts, including substantial reductions of existing stocks in some countries with extensive animal agriculture sectors like Ireland. Yet, an outright end to human consumption of meat and animal products is not currently considered a realistic goal. Therefore, any comprehensive plan of adaptation to the effects of climate change, particularly the present and future effects of climate change on agriculture, must also consider livestock.

Livestock activities also contribute disproportionately to land-use effects, since crops such as corn and alfalfa are cultivated to feed the animals.

In 2010, enteric fermentation accounted for 43% of the total greenhouse gas emissions from all agricultural activity in the world. The meat from ruminants has a higher carbon equivalent footprint than other meats or vegetarian sources of protein based on a global meta-analysis of lifecycle assessment studies. Small ruminants such as sheep and goats contribute approximately 475 million tons of carbon dioxide equivalent to GHG emissions, which constitutes around 6.5% of world agriculture sector emissions. Methane production by animals, principally ruminants, makes up an estimated 15-20% of global production of methane.

Worldwide, livestock production occupies 70% of all land used for agriculture or 30% of the land surface of the Earth. The global food system is responsible for one-third of the global anthropogenic GHG emissions, of which meat accounts for nearly 60%.

Cows, sheep and other ruminants digest their food by enteric fermentation, and their burps are a source of methane emissions from land use, land-use change, and forestry: together with methane and nitrous oxide from manure, this makes livestock the main source of greenhouse gas emissions from agriculture. In addition, manure left on pasture, applied to soil, and treated in management systems together contribute to 7%–10% of global agricultural greenhouse gas emissions.

The IPCC Sixth Assessment Report in 2022 stated that: "Diets high in plant protein and low in meat and dairy are associated with lower GHG emissions. [...] Where appropriate, a shift to diets with a higher share of plant protein, moderate intake of animal-source foods and reduced intake of saturated fats could lead to substantial decreases in GHG emissions. Benefits would also include reduced land occupation and nutrient losses to the surrounding environment, while at the same time providing health benefits and reducing mortality from diet-related non-communicable diseases."

Mean greenhouse gas emissions for different food types
| Food Types | Greenhouse Gas Emissions (g CO2-Ceq per g protein) |
|---|---|
| Ruminant Meat | 62 |
| Recirculating Aquaculture | 30 |
| Trawling Fishery | 26 |
| Non-recirculating Aquaculture | 12 |
| Pork | 10 |
| Poultry | 10 |
| Dairy | 9.1 |
| Non-trawling Fishery | 8.6 |
| Eggs | 6.8 |
| Starchy Roots | 1.7 |
| Wheat | 1.2 |
| Maize | 1.2 |
| Legumes | 0.25 |

According to a 2022 study quickly stopping animal agriculture would provide half the GHG emission reduction needed to meet the Paris Agreement goal of limiting global warming to 2 °C. There are calls to phase out livestock subsidies as part of a just transition.

In the context of global GHG emissions, food production within the global food system accounts for approximately 26%. Breaking it down, livestock and fisheries contribute 31%, whereas crop production, land use, and supply chains add 27%, 24%, and 18% respectively to the emissions.

A 2023 study found that a vegan diet reduced emissions by 75%.

Research in New Zealand estimated that switching agricultural production towards a healthier diet while reducing greenhouse gas emissions would cost approximately 1% of the agricultural sector's export revenue for New Zealand, which is an order of magnitude less than the estimated health system savings from a healthier diet.

Research continues on the use of various seaweed species, in particular Asparagopsis armata, as a food additive that helps reduce methane production in ruminants.

=== Fertilizer ===
The amount of greenhouse gases carbon dioxide, methane and nitrous oxide produced during the manufacture and use of nitrogen fertilizer is estimated as around 5% of anthropogenic greenhouse gas emissions. One third is produced during the production and two thirds during the use of fertilizers. Nitrate is converted by soil bacteria to nitrous oxide, a greenhouse gas. Nitrous oxide emissions by humans, most of which are from fertilizer, between 2007 and 2016 were estimated at 700 million tons of CO_{2} equivalent.

Nitrogen fertilizer was used at a rate of about 110 million tons (of N) per year in 2012. Nitrous oxide (N_{2}O) is the third most important greenhouse gas after carbon dioxide and methane. It has 296 times greater greenhouse effect per ton than carbon dioxide. The 2025 emissions contributed the equivalent of 700 megatons of CO_{2} to the atmosphere. It also contributes to stratospheric ozone depletion. Altering processes and procedures could reduce these emissions.

Methane emissions from crop fields (notably rice paddy fields) are increased by the application of ammonium-based fertilizers. These emissions contribute to global climate change as methane is a potent greenhouse gas.

=== Crop management ===
==== Rice production ====
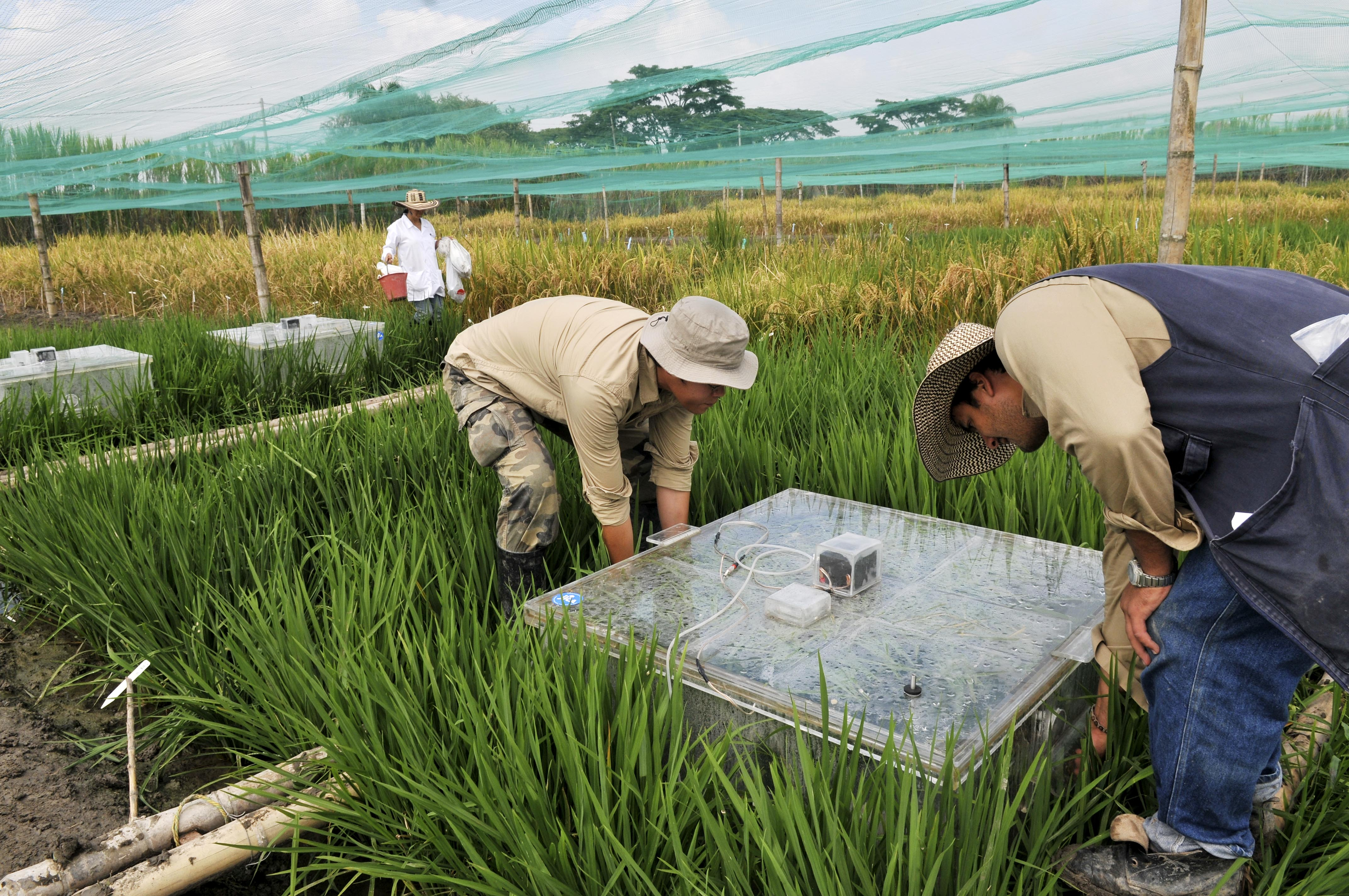
Research work by the International Center for Tropical Agriculture to measure the greenhouse gas emissions of rice production

In 2022, greenhouse gas emissions from rice cultivation were estimated at 5.7 billion tonnes CO2eq, representing 1.2% of total emissions. Within the agriculture sector, rice produces almost half the greenhouse gas emissions from croplands, some 30% of agricultural methane emissions, and 11% of agricultural nitrous oxide emissions. Methane is released from rice fields subject to long-term flooding, as this inhibits the soil from absorbing atmospheric oxygen, resulting in anaerobic fermentation of organic matter in the soil. Emissions can be limited by planting new varieties, not flooding continuously, and removing straw.

It is possible to cut methane emissions in rice cultivation by improved water management, combining dry seeding and one drawdown, or executing a sequence of wetting and drying. This results in emission reductions of up to 90% compared to full flooding and even increased yields.

== Emissions by type of greenhouse gas ==
Agricultural activities emit the greenhouse gases carbon dioxide, methane and nitrous oxide.

=== Carbon dioxide emissions ===
Activities such as tilling of fields, planting of crops, and shipment of products cause carbon dioxide emissions. Agriculture-related emissions of carbon dioxide account for around 11% of global greenhouse gas emissions. Farm practices such as reducing tillage, decreasing empty land, returning biomass residue of crops to the soil, and increasing the use of cover crops can reduce carbon emissions.

=== Methane emissions ===
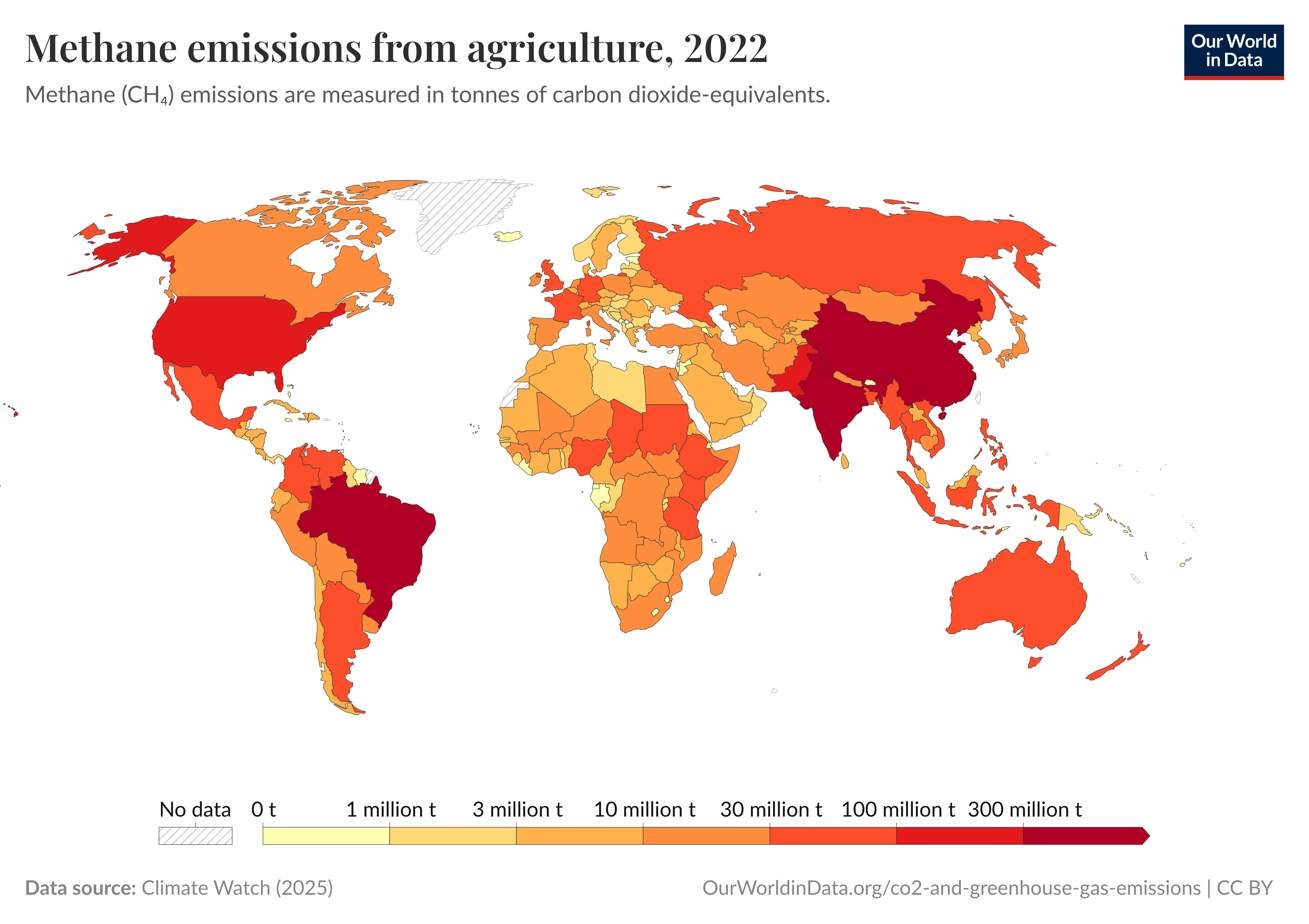
Methane emissions from agriculture, 2019. Methane (CH_{4}) emissions are measured in tonnes of carbon dioxide-equivalents.

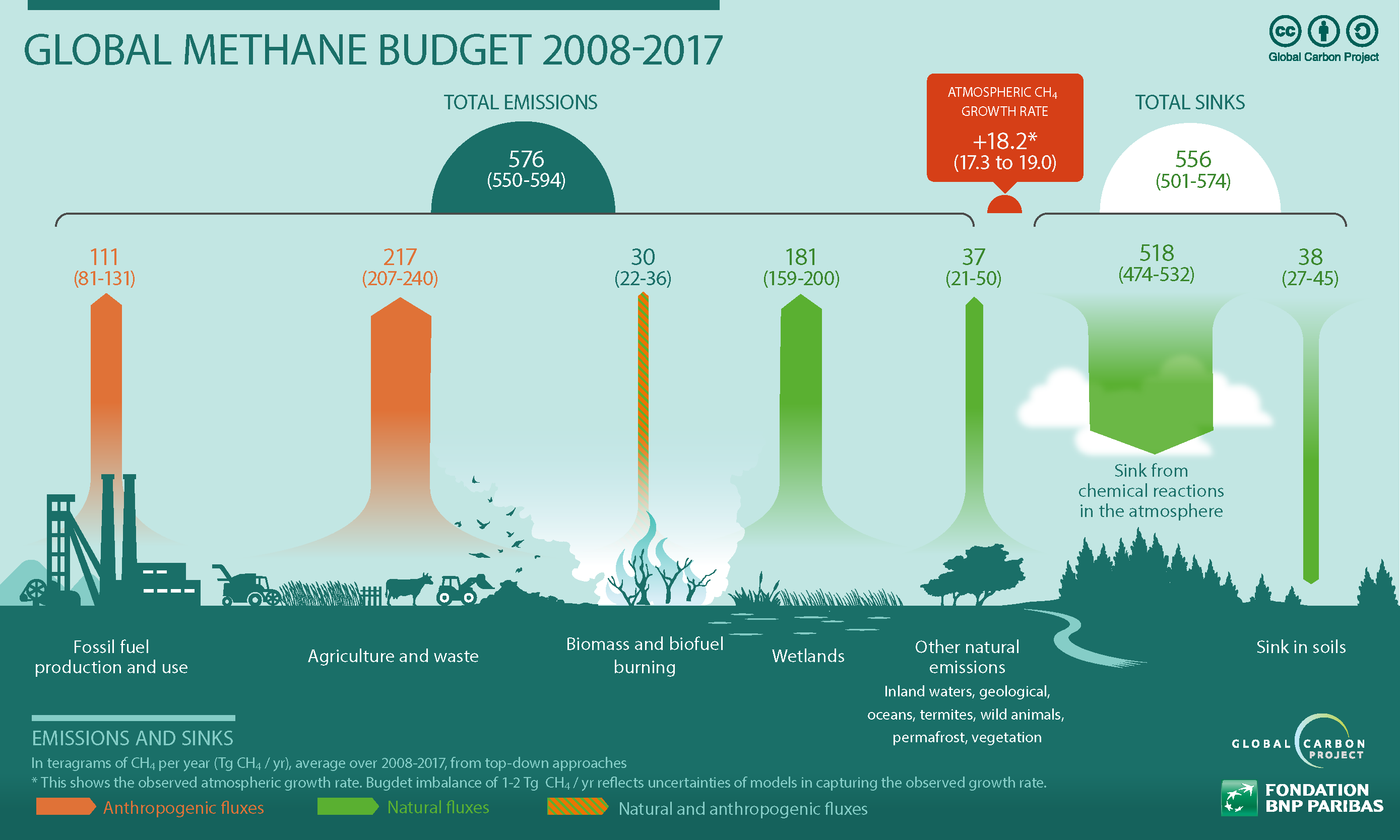
Global methane budget

Methane emissions from livestock are the number one contributor to agricultural greenhouse gases globally. Livestock are responsible for 14.5% of total anthropogenic greenhouse gas emissions. One cow alone will emit 220 pounds of methane per year. While the residence time of methane is much shorter than that of carbon dioxide, it is 28 times more capable of trapping heat. Not only do livestock contribute to harmful emissions, but they also require a lot of land and may overgraze, which leads to unhealthy soil quality and reduced species diversity. A few ways to reduce methane emissions include switching to plant-rich diets with less meat, feeding the cattle more nutritious food, manure management, and composting.

Traditional rice cultivation is the second biggest agricultural methane source after livestock, with a near-term warming impact equivalent to the carbon dioxide emissions from all aviation. Government involvement in agricultural policy is limited due to the high demand for agricultural products like corn, wheat, and milk. The United States Agency for International Development's (USAID) global hunger and food security initiative, the Feed the Future project, is addressing food loss and waste. By addressing food loss and waste, greenhouse gas emission mitigation is also addressed. By only focusing on dairy systems of 20 value chains in 12 countries, food loss and waste could be reduced by 4-10%. These numbers are impactful and would mitigate greenhouse gas emissions while still feeding the population.

=== Nitrous oxide emissions ===
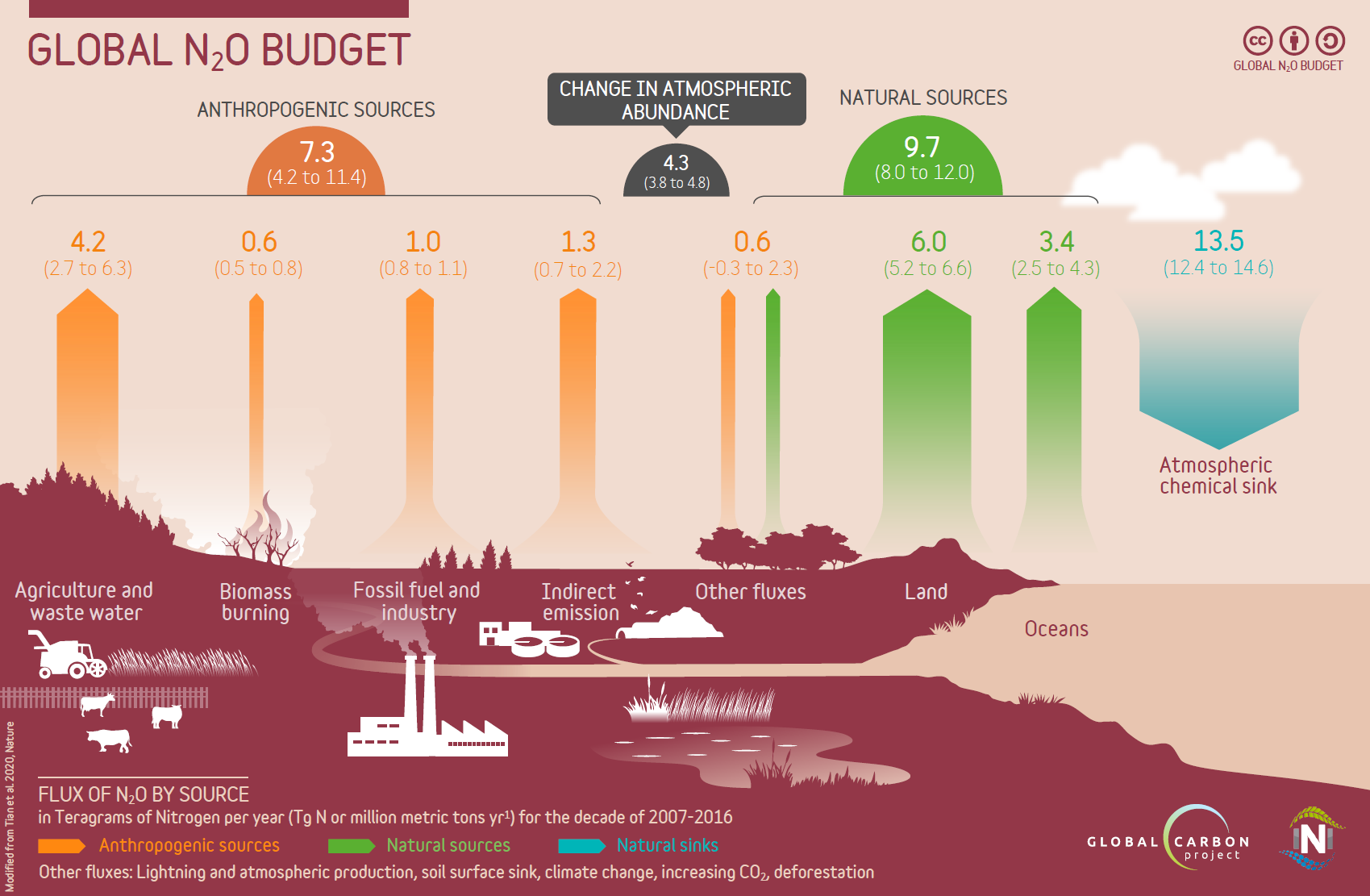
Global nitrous oxide budget

Nitrous oxide emission comes from the increased use of synthetic and organic fertilizers. Fertilizers increase crop yields and allow the crops to grow at a faster rate. Agricultural emissions of nitrous oxide make up 6% of the United States' greenhouse gas emissions; they have increased in concentration by 30% since 1980. While 6% may appear to be a small contribution, nitrous oxide is 300 times more effective at trapping heat per pound than carbon dioxide and has a residence time of around 120 years. Different management practices such as conserving water through drip irrigation, monitoring soil nutrients to avoid overfertilization, and using cover crops in place of fertilizer application may help in reducing nitrous oxide emissions.

== Reducing emissions ==
Agriculture is often not included in government emissions reduction plans. For example, the agricultural sector is exempt from the EU emissions trading scheme which covers around 40% of the EU greenhouse gas emissions.

Almost 20% of greenhouse gas emissions come from the agriculture and forestry sector. To significantly reduce these emissions, annual investments in the agriculture sector need to increase to $260 billion by 2030. The potential benefits from these investments are estimated at $4.3 trillion by 2030, offering a substantial economic return of 16-to-1.

Mitigation measures in the food system can be divided into four categories. These are demand-side changes, ecosystem protections, mitigation on farms, and mitigation in supply chains. On the demand side, limiting food waste is an effective way to reduce food emissions. Changes to a diet less reliant on animal products such as plant-based diets are also effective.

With 21% of global methane emissions, cattle are a major driver of global warming. When rainforests are cut and the land is converted for grazing, the impact is even higher. In Brazil, producing 1 kg of beef can result in the emission of up to 335 kg CO_{2}-eq. Increasing the milk yield of dairy cows has been shown to reduce emissions. Other livestock, manure management and rice cultivation also emit greenhouse gases, in addition to fossil fuel combustion in agriculture.

Important mitigation options for reducing the greenhouse gas emissions from livestock include genetic selection, introduction of methanotrophic bacteria into the rumen, vaccines, feeds, diet modification and grazing management. Other options are diet changes towards ruminant-free alternatives, such as milk substitutes and meat analogues. Non-ruminant livestock, such as poultry, emit far fewer GHGs.

It is possible to cut methane emissions in rice cultivation by improved water management, combining dry seeding and one drawdown, or executing a sequence of wetting and drying. This results in emission reductions of up to 90% compared to full flooding and even increased yields.

Reducing the usage of nitrogen fertilizers through nutrient management could avoid nitrous oxide emissions equal to 2.77 - 11.48 gigatons of carbon dioxide from 2020 to 2050.

== See also ==
- Agroecology – Study of ecological processes in agriculture
- Effects of climate change on agriculture
- Effects of climate change on livestock
- Environmental issues with agriculture
