= 2022 United Nations Climate Change Conference =

Yearly conference held for climate change treaty negotiations

- Native name: مؤتمر الأمم المتحدة للتغير المناخي 2022
- Date: 6–20 November 2022
- Location: SHICC, Sharm El Sheikh, South Sinai Governorate, Egypt; 27°56′42″N 34°21′48″E
- Organised by: Egypt
- Participants: UNFCCC member countries
- Previous event: ← Glasgow 2021
- Next event: → Dubai 2023
- Website: cop27.eg

The 2022 United Nations Climate Change Conference or Conference of the Parties of the UNFCCC, more commonly referred to as COP27, was the 27th United Nations Climate Change conference, held from 6 November until 20 November 2022 in Sharm El Sheikh, Egypt. It took place under the presidency of Egyptian Minister of Foreign Affairs Sameh Shoukry, with more than 92 heads of state and an estimated 35,000 representatives, or delegates, of 190 countries attending. It was the fifth climate summit held in Africa, and the first since 2016.

The conference has been held annually (except 2020 due to the COVID-19 pandemic) since the first UN climate agreement in 1992. It is used by governments to agree on policies to limit global temperature rises and adapt to impacts associated with climate change. The conference led to the first loss-and-damage fund being created.

== Background ==
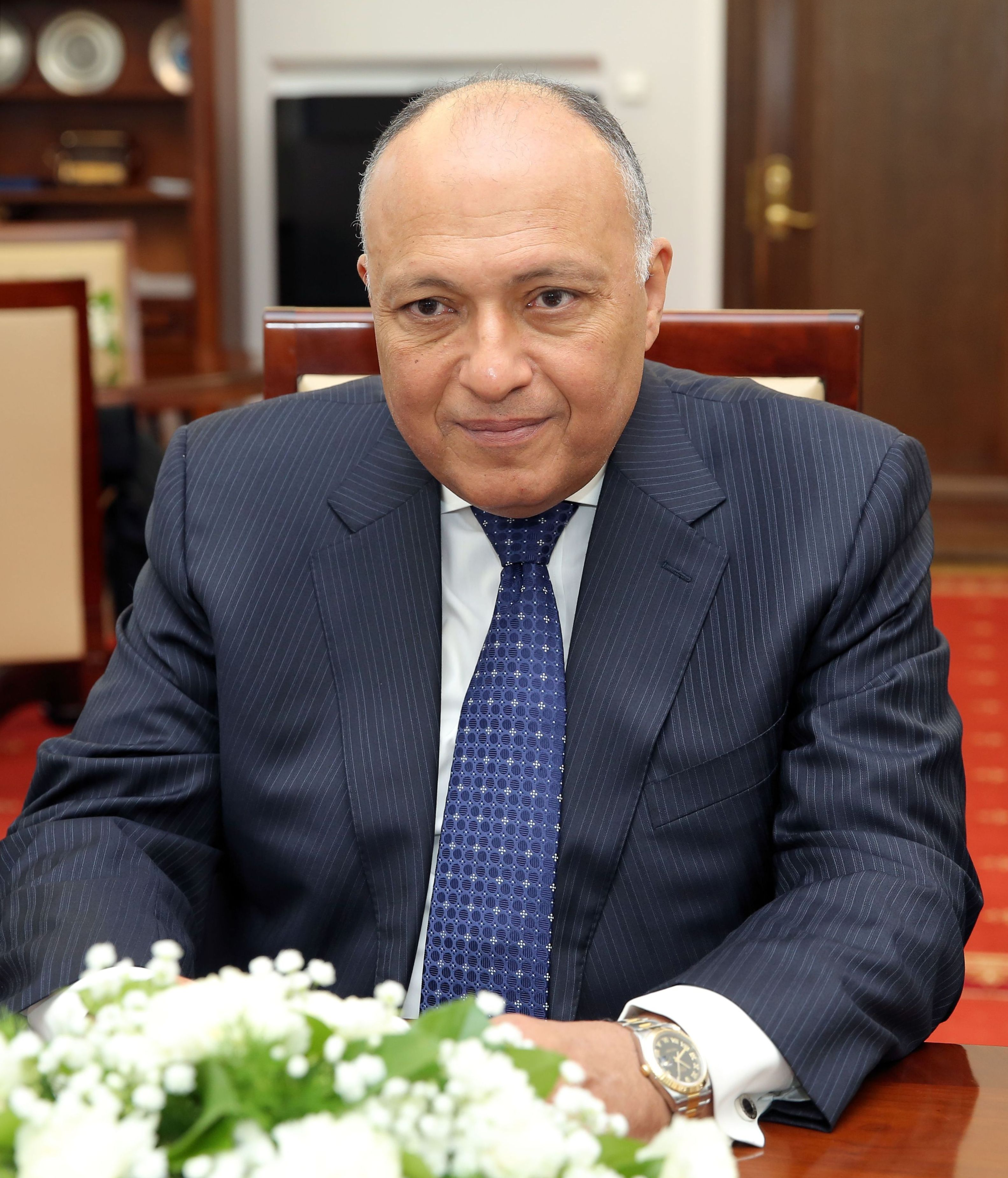
Egyptian Minister of Foreign Affairs Sameh Shoukry was the president of COP27.

Egypt was announced as the host of the conference following a successful bid launched in 2021. On 8 January 2022, the Minister of Environment of Egypt, Yasmine Fouad, met with COP26 President Alok Sharma to discuss preparations for the conference. The Egyptian organizers advised countries to set aside tensions over the 2022 Russian invasion of Ukraine to ensure negotiations are successful.

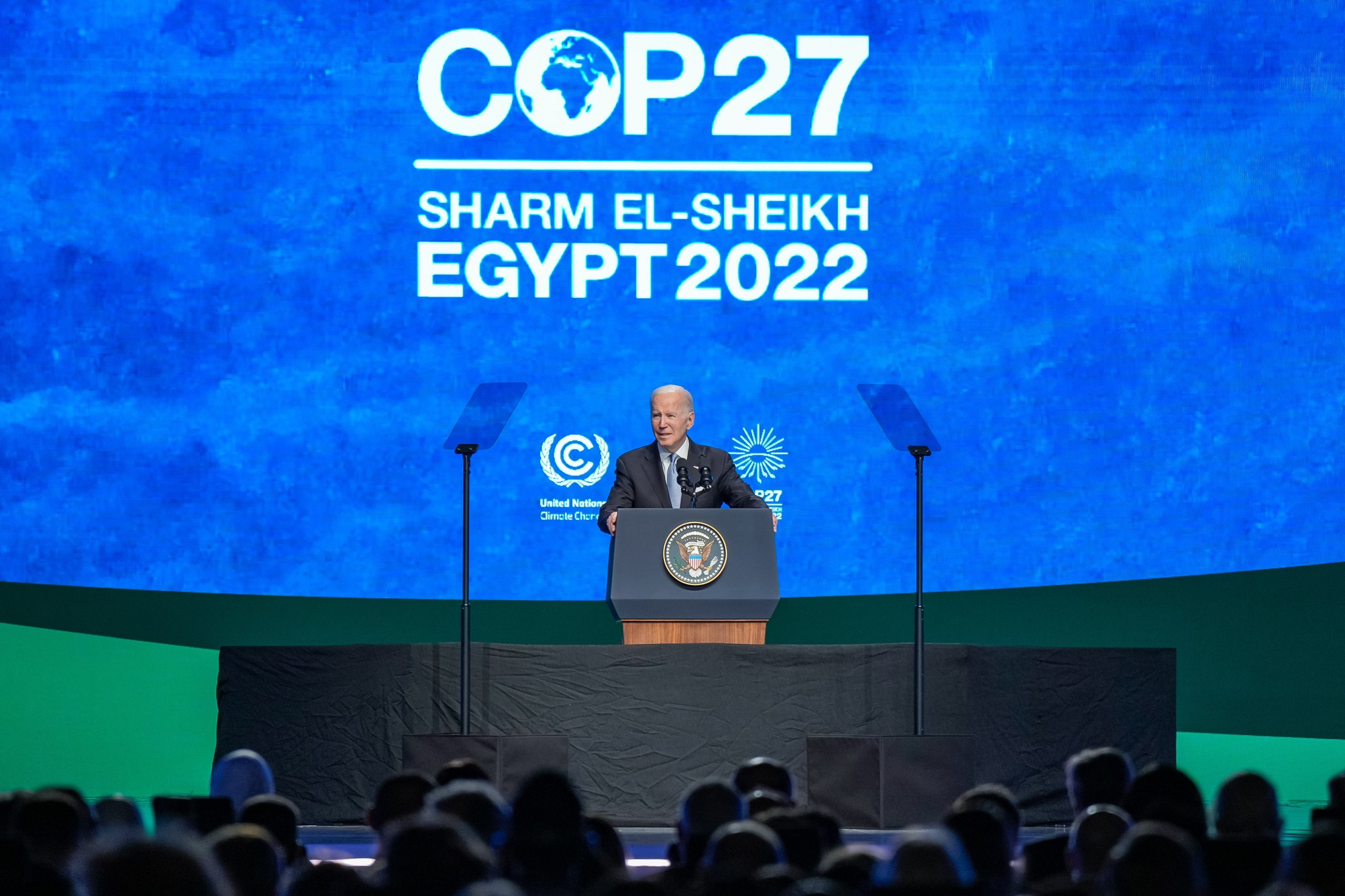
President Biden speaks at the 2022 United Nations Climate Change Conference.

Possible climate change measures were discussed at the 2022 United Nations General Assembly, including the governments of several island nations launching the Rising Nations initiative, and Denmark and Scotland announcing climate finance measures for developing countries. On 14 October 2022, the Scottish government called for climate reparations at COP27, as a "moral responsibility". At a pre-COP meeting in October 2022, UN Secretary-General António Guterres emphasized the importance of the conference given the impacts of climate change observed in 2022, such as floods in Pakistan, heatwaves in Europe and Hurricane Ian that impacted countries in South, Central and North America.

The conference was the first COP to take place in Africa since 2016, when COP22 was held in Marrakesh. Egypt's Minister of Foreign Affairs Sameh Shoukry took over the presidency from Sharma at the start of the conference. The United States decided to support climate talks at COP27, and pledged to try to assist countries that are most affected by climate change.

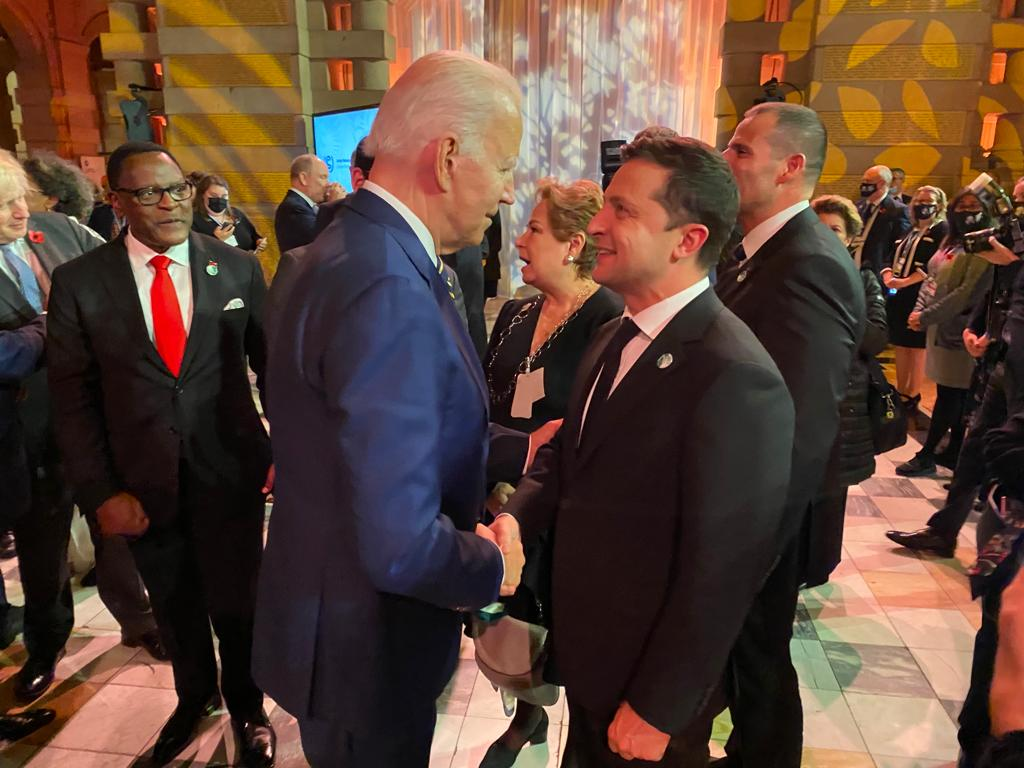
Volodymyr Zelensky at the 2021 UN Climate Change Conference

One week ahead of the summit, the United Nations Environment Programme (UNEP), released a report outlining how there was "no credible pathway" to limiting global temperature increase to 1.5 °C and that mitigation efforts since COP26 had been "woefully inadequate". But countries can curb time spent in a warmer world by adopting more ambitious climate pledges and decarbonizing faster, according to a new research published in the academic journal Nature Climate Change during the COP27.

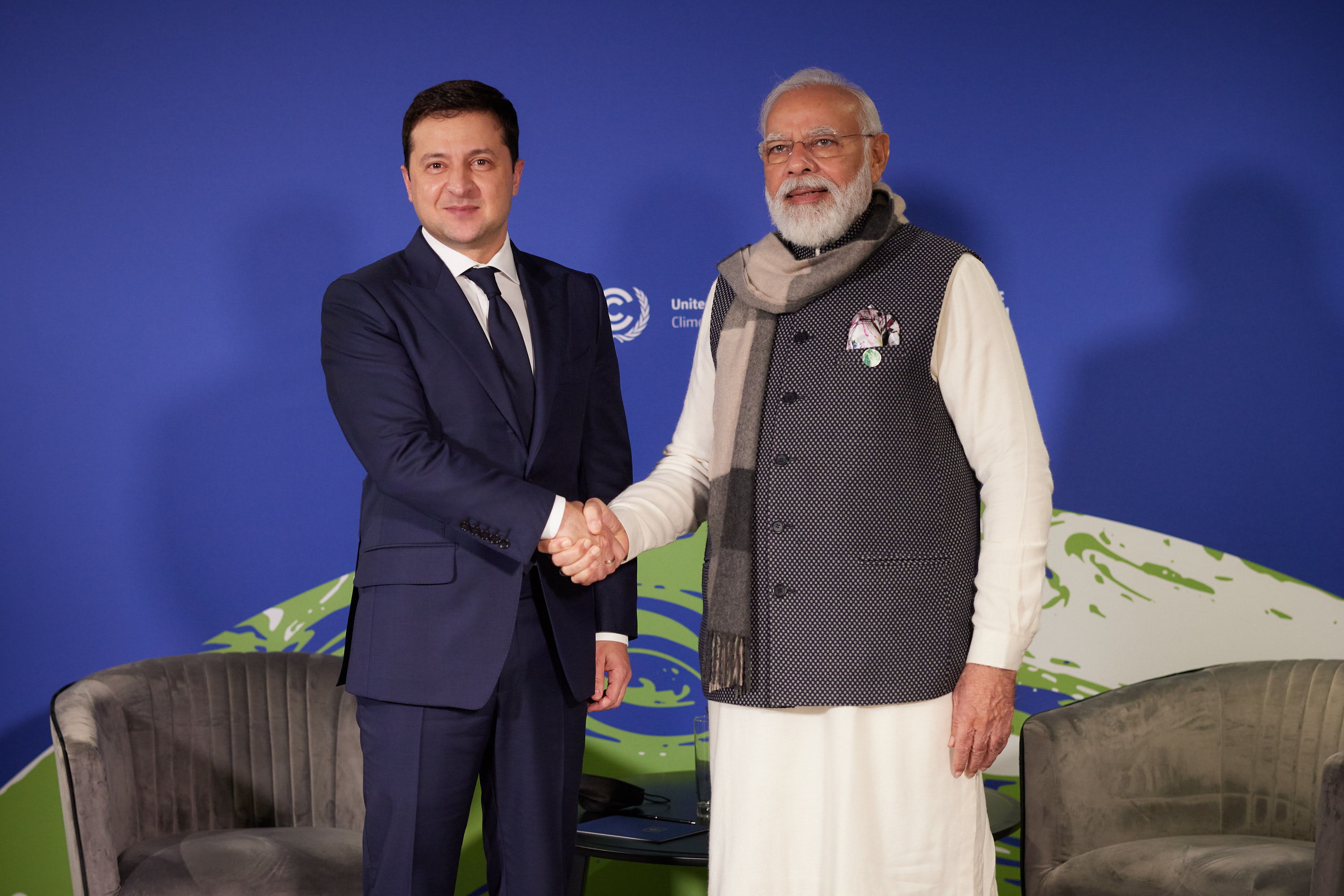
Volodymyr Zelensky at the COP26 UN Climate Change Conference

Several days before the opening of the summit a report was published, sponsored by some of the biggest agricultural companies. The report was produced by Sustainable Markets Initiative, an organization of companies trying to become climate friendly, established by King Charles III. According to the report, regenerative agriculture is already implemented on 15% of all cropland. The rate of transition is nevertheless "far too slow" and must be tripled by the year 2030 for preventing the global temperature to pass the threshold of 1.5 °C above pre-industrial level. Agricultural practices must immediately change so as not to "destroy[...] the planet". One of the authors emphasized that "[t]he interconnection between human health and planetary health is more evident than ever before". The authors proposed a set of measures for accelerating the transition, like creating metrics for measuring how much the farming is sustainable and pay the farmers who will change their farming mode to more sustainable. They wanted to present their propositions in the summit.

Two days before the start of the talks, a compromise was reached, "that discussion would focus on 'cooperation and facilitation' not 'liability or compensation'". The ultimate goal of the 2022 COP27 was in dispute. Wealthy countries were expected to focus on ways to help developing nations phase out fossil fuels and transition to renewable energy. However, there are tensions between richer, developed countries and poorer nations, over who should pay the costs of global warming. This is because developed countries bear the brunt of climate impacts as they contribute higher carbon emissions and environmental pollution. These discrepancies were expected to be defined and decided in the conference.

=== Sponsorship ===
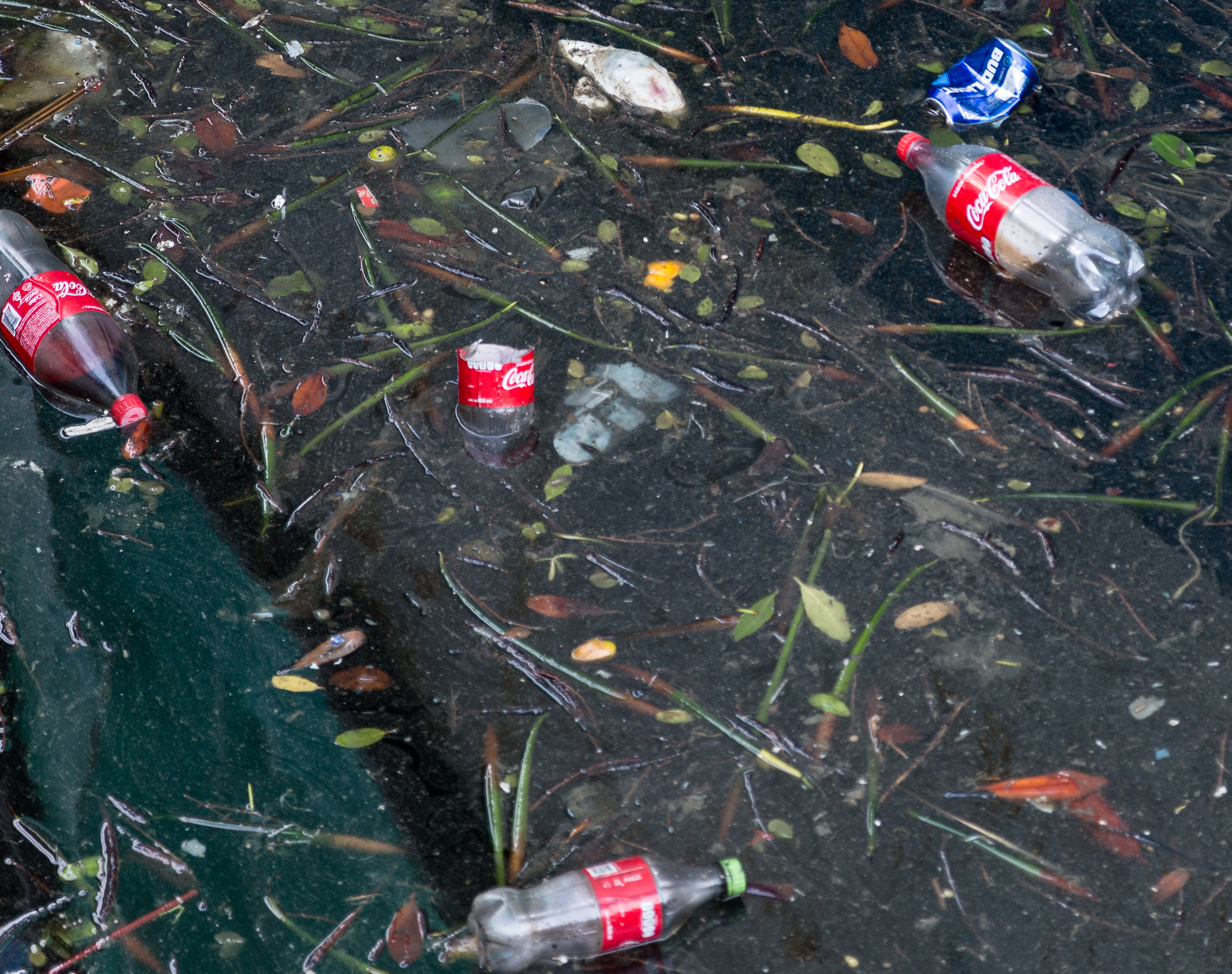
Plastic Coca-Cola bottles littered in nature

The conference was sponsored by Coca-Cola. Several environmental campaigners suggested this was greenwashing, given the company's contribution to plastic pollution. Coca-Cola is the largest plastic polluter in the world with 1.9 billion consumptions of Coca-Cola products per day around the world. This has led to three million tons of plastic packaging used by the Coca-Cola Company in one year. These plastic bottles are not biodegradable and are fabricated from toxic chemical compounds. For example, plastic Coca-Cola bottles demonstrated high levels of phthalate ester leaching. It is recommended to avoid drinking from plastic bottles that leach these chronic and highly toxic chemicals. Lack of proper disposal causes these bottles to be released into the environment. This has harmful consequences to animals if they ingest plastics and in environments such as degradation into microplastics. Coca-Cola is a multinational litter brand meaning its single-use plastic packaging has various consequences dependent on regional and national plastic regulations and/or laws. The company also has very high water usage despite its water neutrality pledge.

=== Challenges for the African continent ===
In a report published in October 2021, the Intergovernmental Panel on Climate Change (IPCC) considered Africa to be the most vulnerable continent to the effects of climate change. More than 100 million Africans will in fact be threatened by global warming between now and 2030. Thus many states, NGOs and African commentators hoped that the holding of this summit in an African country would improve the visibility of the priority demands of civil society and African States, in particular the compensation of developing countries for the consequences of global warming. There will be an increase in many threats such as droughts, rain season timing changes, temperatures and precipitation. This will not only have consequences on people but also on agriculture. These changes will affect crop production as it is dependent on temperature, humidity, and precipitation. Lack of produce will have negative consequences on many countries in Africa by struggling to support and feed the population.

== Participation ==
Venue of COP27 in Sharm El Sheikh

As a COVID-19 recovery strategy, the Egyptian government increased hotel prices in Sharm El Sheikh, leading to concerns over the affordability and inclusivity of the conference. Egypt's foreign, environment and social solidarity ministries privately selected and screened local NGOs that would be permitted to apply for one-time registration for the climate summit. The application process and the selection criteria were not made public.

French president Emmanuel Macron delivers a speech at COP27.

Around 90 heads of state and representatives from more than 190 countries were expected to attend, including United States president Joe Biden and climate envoy John Kerry, French president Emmanuel Macron, German chancellor Olaf Scholz, European Commission president Ursula von der Leyen, Indian prime minister Narendra Modi, Kenyan president William Ruto and Sri Lankan president Ranil Wickremesinghe.

By the number of attendees the COP is the second largest after COP26 in Glasgow, at 33,449 participants. This is the first COP without observer states as all participating countries, including Vatican City, have ratified the United Nations Framework Convention on Climate Change. Of the 11,711 participants, 1,751 were from non-governmental organizations. The United Arab Emirates led the largest delegation with 1,073 participants, followed by Brazil (573) and the Democratic Republic of the Congo (459). Many of the ten largest delegations came from African countries.

UK prime minister Rishi Sunak initially said that he would not attend COP27. However, on 2 November, Sunak backtracked and announced he would attend. Former prime minister Boris Johnson and Scottish first minister Nicola Sturgeon also attended the conference. Right after winning the 2022 general election, president-elect Luiz Inácio Lula da Silva of Brazil confirmed he would attend the summit.

=== Non-attendees ===
Among the heads of state and government not attending were Chinese leader Xi Jinping and his premier Li Keqiang, as well as Russia's Vladimir Putin and his prime minister Mikhail Mishustin.

In September 2022, Egypt warned the UK not to backtrack on its climate targets, in light of a change to the new government of prime minister Liz Truss, and the announcement that new monarch Charles III would not attend the conference on Truss's advice. Following Truss's resignation, the request that Charles III not attend remained in place. Instead, he hosted a reception to discuss climate change at Buckingham Palace two days prior to COP27.

Australian prime minister Anthony Albanese, outgoing Brazilian president Jair Bolsonaro, and Swedish climate activist Greta Thunberg did not attend COP27.

== During the summit ==
=== Itinerary and events ===
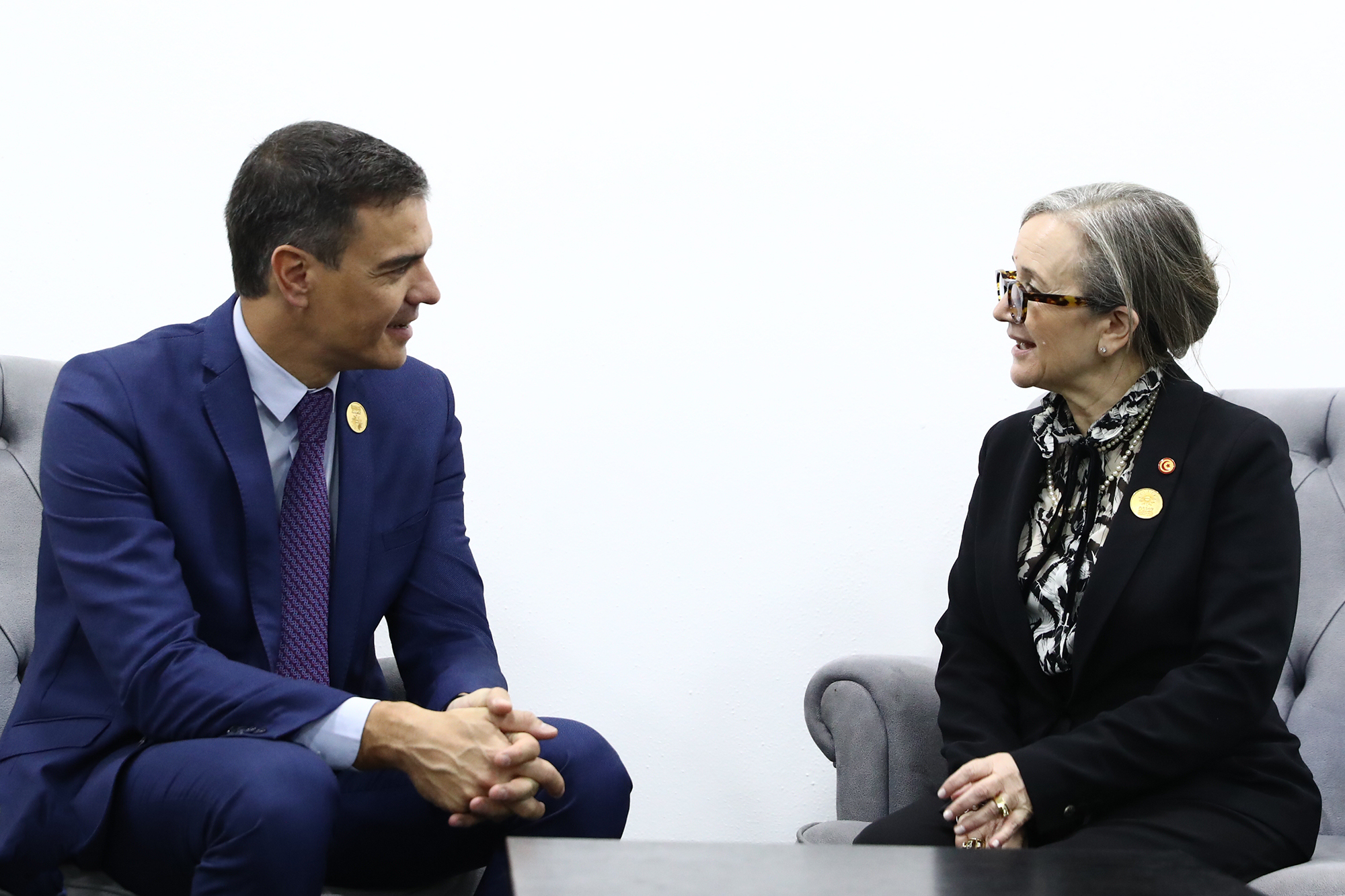
The prime ministers of Spain and Tunisia, Pedro Sánchez and Najla Bouden, holding a bilateral meeting at COP27

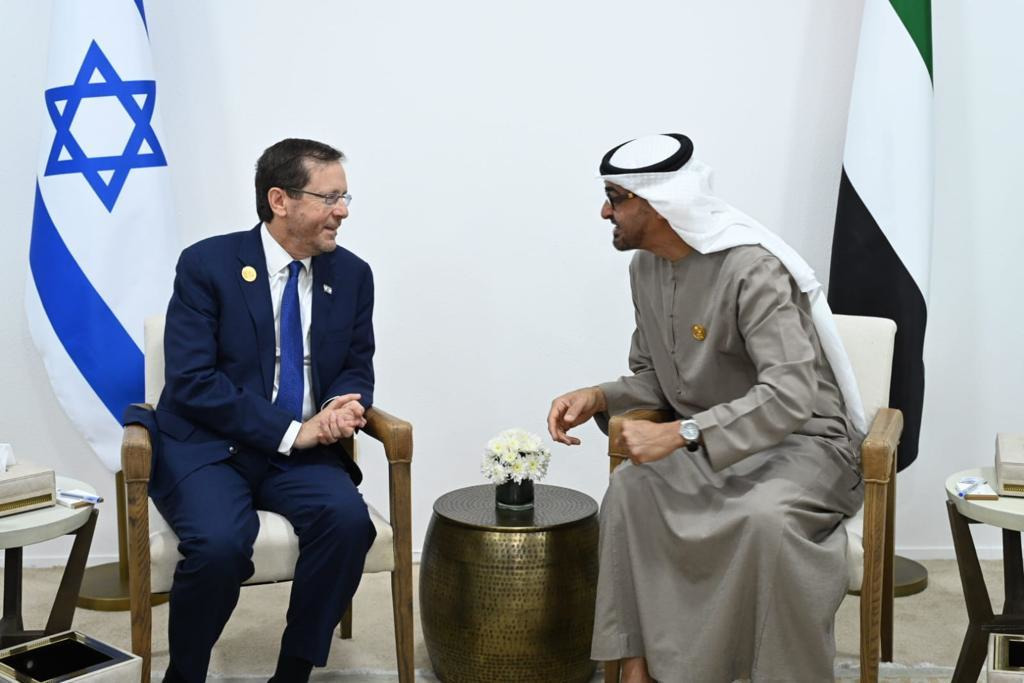
Israeli President Isaac Herzog and UAE's President Mohamed bin Zayed Al Nahyan, holding a bilateral meeting at COP27

On 7 and 8 November, the conference began with a World Leaders' Summit, followed by discussions on topics such as climate finance, decarbonization, climate change adaptation and agriculture during the first week. The second week is expected to cover gender, water and biodiversity. French president Emmanuel Macron, Dutch prime minister Mark Rutte and Senegalese president Macky Sall will host an event on accelerating climate change adaptation in Africa. India has sought clarity and definition on climate finance besides motivating other countries to provide technology to combat climate and disasters.

Event spaces on the opening day of the conference were told they may need to be cancelled, unless they involve visiting heads of state, following tightening of security. These restrictions will not apply to the following day of the conference. Some NGOs criticized the move. Media access to the pavilions is also expected to have heavy restrictions.

On 8 November, the High-Level Expert Group on the Net Zero Emissions Commitments of Non-State Entities of the United Nations formed the previous March by UN Secretary-General António Guterres and chaired by former Canadian Minister of Environment and Climate Change Catherine McKenna released a report that stated that the carbon neutrality pledges of many corporations, local governments, regional governments, and financial institutions around the world often amount to nothing more than greenwashing and provided 10 recommendations to ensure greater credibility and accountability for carbon neutrality pledges such as requiring non-state actors to publicly disclose and report verifiable information (e.g. greenhouse gas inventories and carbon footprint accounting in prospectus for financial securities) that substantiates compliance with such pledges. After the release of the report, a research consortium called the Net Zero Tracker that includes the NewClimate Institute, the Energy and Climate Intelligence Unit, the Data-Driven EnviroLab of the University of North Carolina at Chapel Hill, and the Net Zero Initiative at the University of Oxford issued a report evaluating the climate neutrality pledges of 116 of 713 regional governments, of 241 of 1,177 cities with populations greater than 500,000, and of 1,156 of 2,000 publicly listed companies in the 25 countries with the greatest emissions (whose pledges cover more than 90% of the gross world product) by the recommendations of the UN report and found that many these pledges were largely unsubstantiated and more than half of cities have no plan for tracking and reporting compliance with pledges.

=== Opening days ===
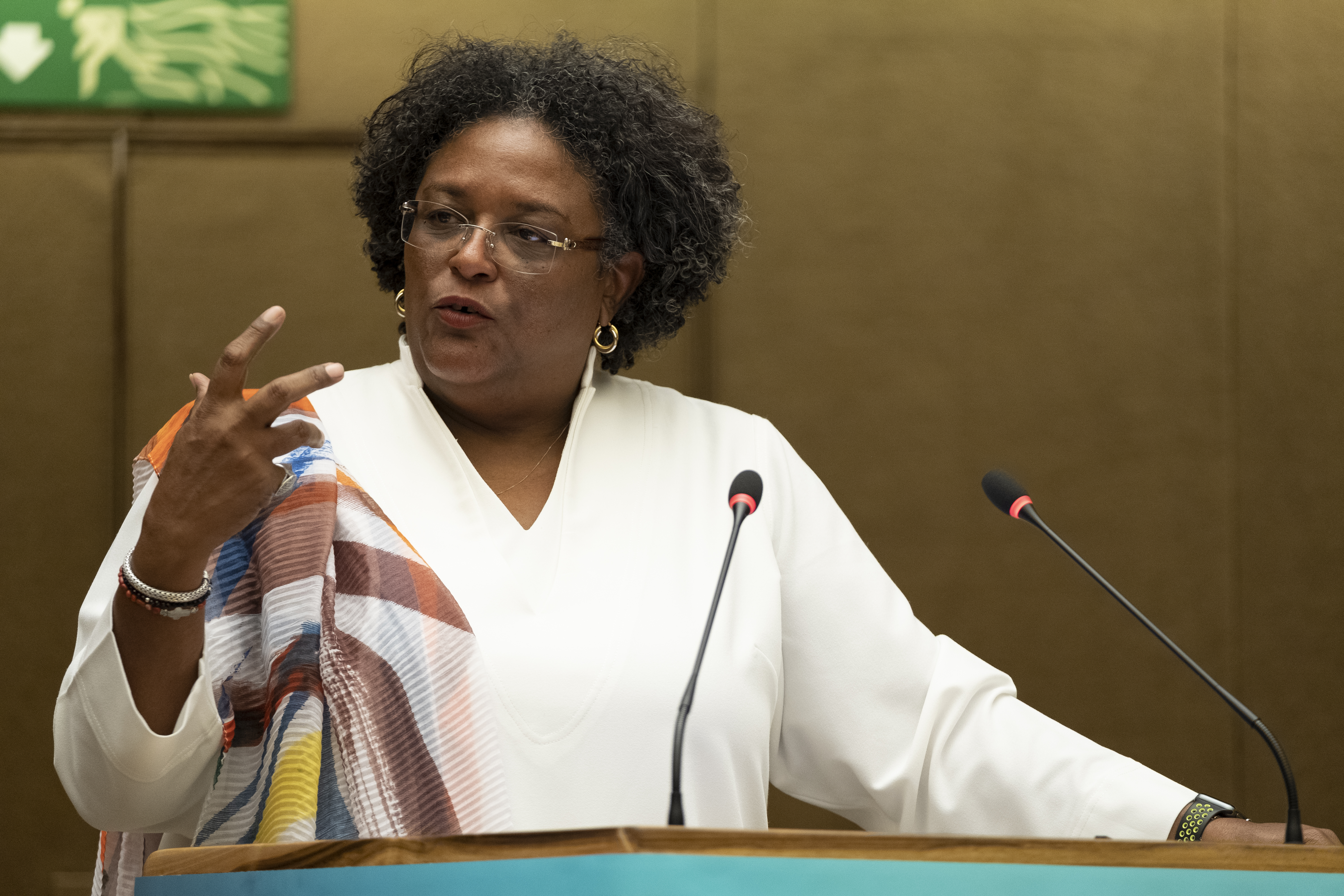
Mia Mottley, Prime Minister of Barbados

In his opening remarks, Egyptian president Abdel Fattah el-Sisi called for countries to act on climate change, drawing attention to the impact of extreme weather events in recent years. Barbados premier Mia Mottley called for grant-based rather than loan-based approach to climate finance. She requested that world leaders implement natural disaster clauses to developing countries' debt. She claimed that development banks, the institutions that provide developing countries with loans for infrastructure development, were outdated. In her speech, she praised Denmark as the first country to propose a fund that directly helps countries who face the most severe consequences from climate change.

=== Negotiations ===
The United States proposed a system of carbon credits for facilitating energy transition in low-income countries. The US International Development Finance Corporation tried to increase investment to help low-income countries deal with different impacts of climate change. As a whole, rich countries gave $29 billion to the issue in the year 2020 but it is only a fraction of what is needed. The climate minister of Pakistan Sherry Rehman demanded high-income countries will pay for the damage caused by climate change impacts, stating that floods in Pakistan cost the country $30 billion that "Pakistan cannot afford". Some countries do announce new funding to support loss and damage in recent days, including New Zealand ($20 million) and Austria (€50 million). Germany and Denmark pledged more than €170 million for the "Global Shield", a new fund that will help to lower income countries cope with climate disasters. Negotiations over loss and damage are expected to continue.

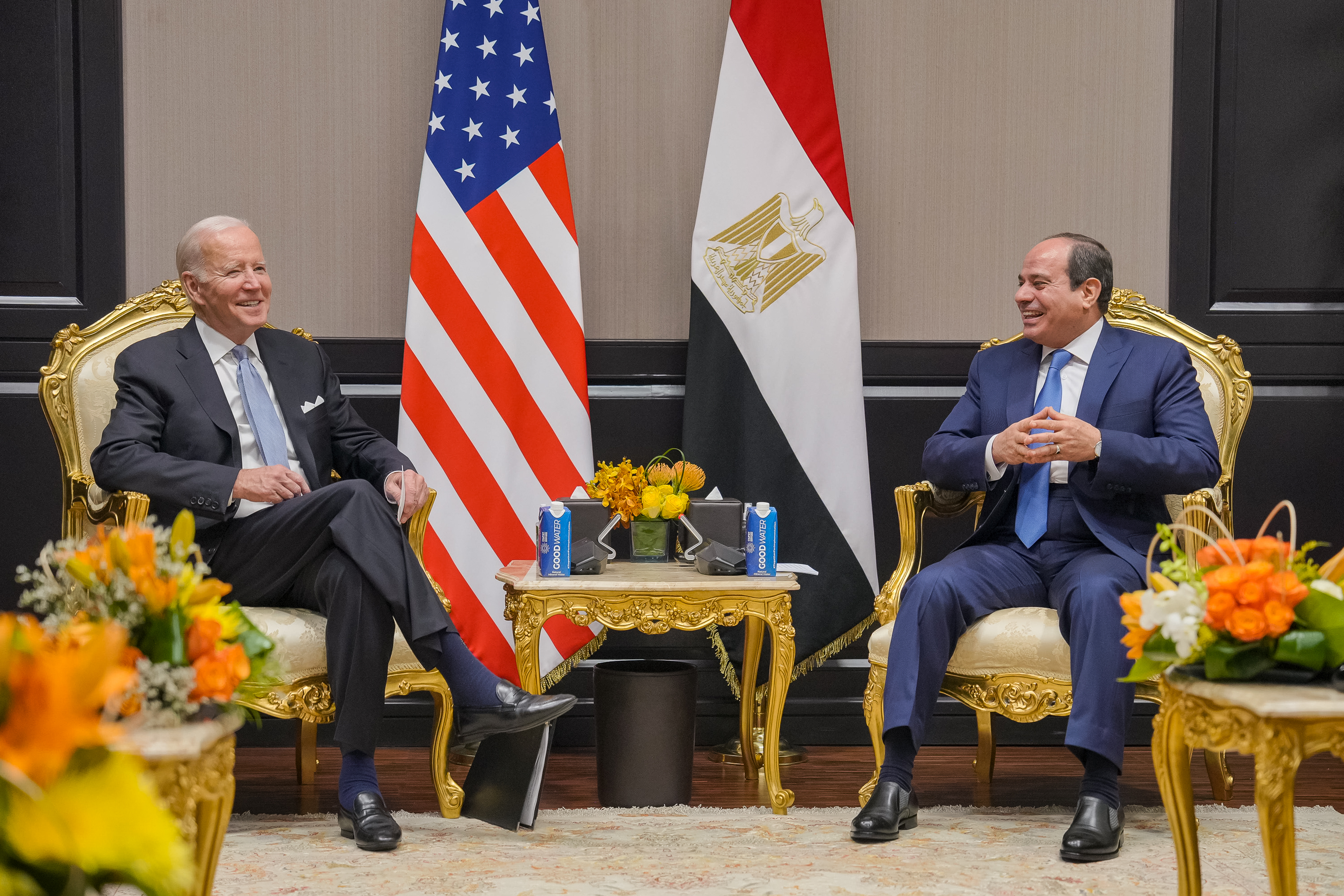
Egyptian President Abdel Fattah el-Sisi and US President Joe Biden, holding a bilateral meeting at COP27

Germany and the United States announced over $250 million in resources to support Egypt's clean energy economy. The program will deploy new wind and solar energy while decommissioning inefficient natural gas generation. It is also expected to enhance energy security by freeing up over two billion cubic meters of gas.

A new site called Climate Trace was opened, showing from where exactly greenhouse gas emissions came. The map is open to the public. The aim is to provide public with correct information as self-reported information is often unreliable, especially about methane. The data is based on measurements from satellites, and sensors on land and on ships and planes.

Over 150 states pledged to curb methane emissions. China did not join this undertaking and refused to commit to provide economic assistance to vulnerable countries. This has been interpreted as a walk back from its diplomatic strategy to create strong links with the developing world.

=== Plant Based Treaty advocates ===
A coalition of organisations headed by NGO ProVeg International erected the first-ever pavilion dedicated to the climate impact of food at an international climate conference. The pavilion is called Food4Climate and participants all seek food systems change. Participants include Upfield, Oatly, Impossible Foods, the International Panel of Experts on Sustainable Food Systems (IPES-Food), and the Jeremy Coller Foundation.

On 11 November, celebrities, politicians, and businesses delivered a letter to COP27 President Sameh Shoukry calling for COP27 to adopt a global Plant Based Treaty. The treaty calls for:

- an end to the expansion of animal agriculture;
- the promotion of a shift to sustainable plant-based diets;
- and an effort to "reforest and rewild" planet Earth.

Those advocating for a Plant Based Treaty also urge the adoption of a Soil Treaty at COP27.

On 12 November, Nitin Mehta the founder of Indian Cultural Centre of London wrote in The Sunday Guardian that if COP27 delegates do not decree that humans "abandon meat, fish, eggs and dairy" then COP27 will be a failure. As she waited in line at COP27 for a vegan burger, Sarah Garry of the British Society of Soil Science told CNBC that the vendor was the only place selling vegetarian food at the event plagued by logistics issues. Reuters reported that grilled meat and activists protesting animal agriculture are very visible at COP27, but governments, many of which heavily subsidize animal agriculture, have made no proposals to cut production of animal agriculture products. Instead governments are proposing controversial technical proposals to capture methane from animals or doctor their feed to make them produce less methane. Supporters of the plant-based treaty handed out free vegan burgers at the event. American columnist Avery Yale Kamila wrote that COP27 "leaders ignored the Plant Based Treaty", adding that "After all these years, Egypt's "flesh pots" documented in the Old Testament remain entrenched." Chatham House expert Tim Benton said "Notably disappointing was that, although food systems were much in debate unlike in previous COPs, there was still significant political resistance to fully adopting a systems approach."

== Outcomes ==
At the conference, a loss and damage fund was agreed for the first time, which was considered a significant achievement. The loss and damage fund is an agreement to provide funding to countries who are most vulnerable and affected by climate change. This was a very significant breakthrough that helps developing countries that experience the worst impacts.

A commitment to phase out fossil fuels was not made. Countries had failed to move away from fossil fuels. Although they have focused on "low-emission energy", this still continues to be a source of greenhouse gas emissions.

== Reception ==
=== Before the summit and protests ===
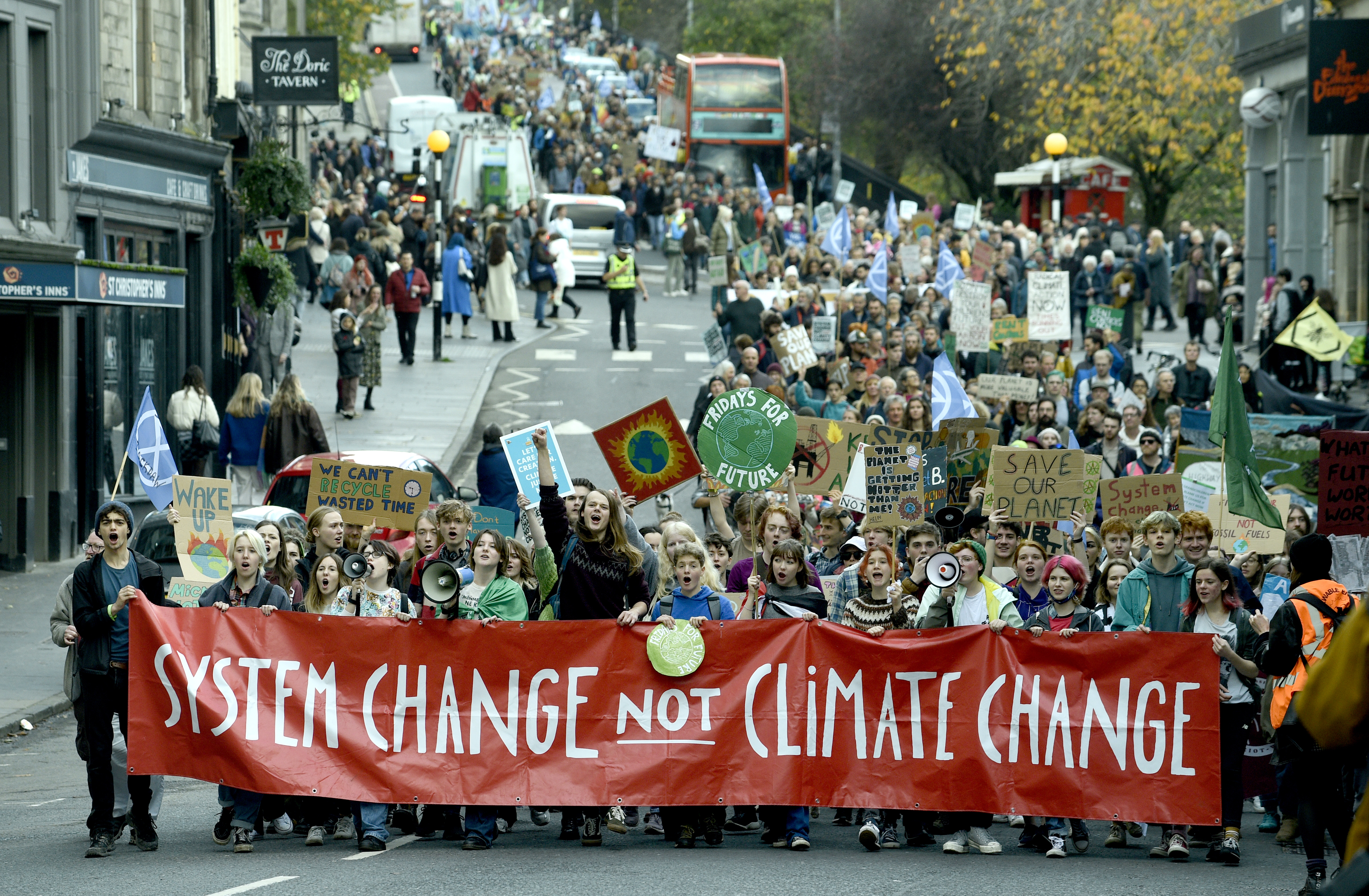
Protest march in Edinburgh, Scotland as part of Global Day of Action for climate justice, 12 November 2022

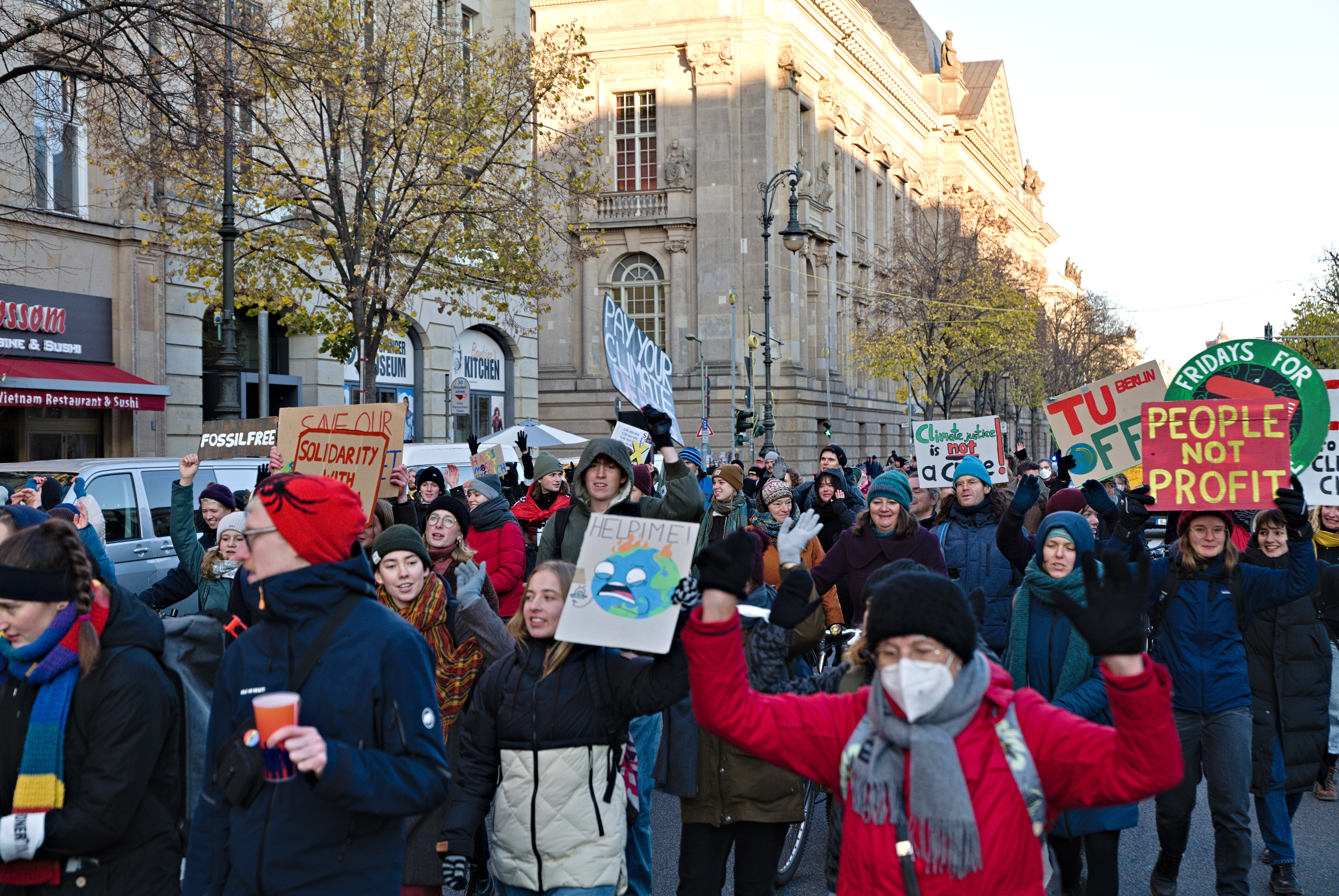
Protest in Berlin, Germany, 18 November 2022

Climate protests are common at each annual negotiation, and in previous years there have been sit-ins, marches, hunger strikes, and other forms of civil disobedience to call attention to the urgency of climate change.

Ahead of the 2022 summit, the choice of Egypt as a host country attracted attention, in particular in regards to the country's human rights record, which The New York Times described as "abysmal," and fossil fuel use. Issues raised by critics included the authoritarian political system, mass imprisonment and curbs on civil society and dissent since 2013, under the leadership of Abdel Fattah el-Sisi. International human rights organizations reported that there are about 60,000 political prisoners in Egypt. Imprisoned Egyptian activist Alaa Abd El-Fattah criticized COP27 taking place in Egypt, and stated that "Of all the countries to host they chose the one banning protest and sending everyone to prison, which shows how the world is handling this issue." Naomi Klein, Bill McKibben and British Green Party MP Caroline Lucas are among the signatories who have signed a letter detailing their concerns about holding COP27 in Egypt.

On 15 July 2022, a White House adviser, Jerome Foster II, and a British climate justice activist, Elijah Mckenzie-Jackson, wrote a letter to the UNFCCC condemning the choice of Egypt as host of the COP27. The letter written to Patricia Espinosa, executive secretary of UNFCCC, requested it to move the conference to another safer African country due to concerns over LGBT rights, women's rights and civil rights suppression in Egypt. Various human rights groups, including Amnesty International, viewed COP27 as an opportunity for Egypt to lift restrictions on civic space, and advocated for it to release its political prisoners and create a safe environment for advocates after COP27 ends.

Human Rights Watch expressed concerns regarding the state of freedom of expression in Egypt, and questioned to what extent it would be possible to protest in a country that has essentially banned all demonstrations and criminalized free assembly. On 12 September 2022, Human Rights Watch published a report based on interviews with more than a dozen activists, academics, scientists, and journalists working on environmental issues in Egypt. The report suggests that restrictions from the Egyptian government on independent nongovernmental organizations, including environmental groups, has curtailed organizations' ability to carry out independent advocacy and field work towards protecting the natural environment. In October 2022, the environment director at Human Rights Watch, Richard Pearshouse, stated that Egypt has threatened to derail meaningful global climate action by silencing the country's independent environmentalists before COP27. Attendees including Big Wind Carpenter also expressed concern about their safety as LGBTQ+ people in Egypt.

When the official smartphone app for COP27 was released in late October, various human rights and security experts, such as Hossam Bahgat, discovered that it asks for various and unreasonable permissions for access to user data, such as emails and location tracking, which could be used by the Egyptian government for surveillance of attendants.

An Egyptian American, Sherif Osman, criticized the authorities in Egypt before the country hosted the COP27 climate conference. He also urged people to organize demonstrations during the summit. In a video on his YouTube channel, he said that "people must wake up and take to the streets". On 6 November 2022, Osman was arrested by the UAE authorities, outside a restaurant in Dubai. An Arab League entity, Egypt requested the arrest on charges including "speaking negatively against government institutions". Osman's fiancée, Saija Virta, said she feared that he might face possible extradition to Egypt. On 21 December 2022, Osman was announced to be deported soon from his detention in the UAE. However, the concern for his safety remained the same since it was not told whether he would be deported to Egypt or the United States. Rights groups have expressed concerns that, if deported to Egypt, Osman could be put at significant risk of abuse and torture. The UAE's decision also raised concerns around how the Emirates will treat the civil society when it will host the COP28 in 2023. Amnesty International said there are fears that "the UAE will repeat the restrictions on civic space and protests seen at Cop27". Meanwhile, the Emirates also hired US-based PR firms and lobbying agencies, including Akin Gump and FleishmanHillard, which assisted the UAE in laundering its international reputation and promoting itself as the host of COP28. As per the reports, the UAE started working in that direction even before the COP27 started.

==== Alaa Abd El-Fattah hunger strike ====
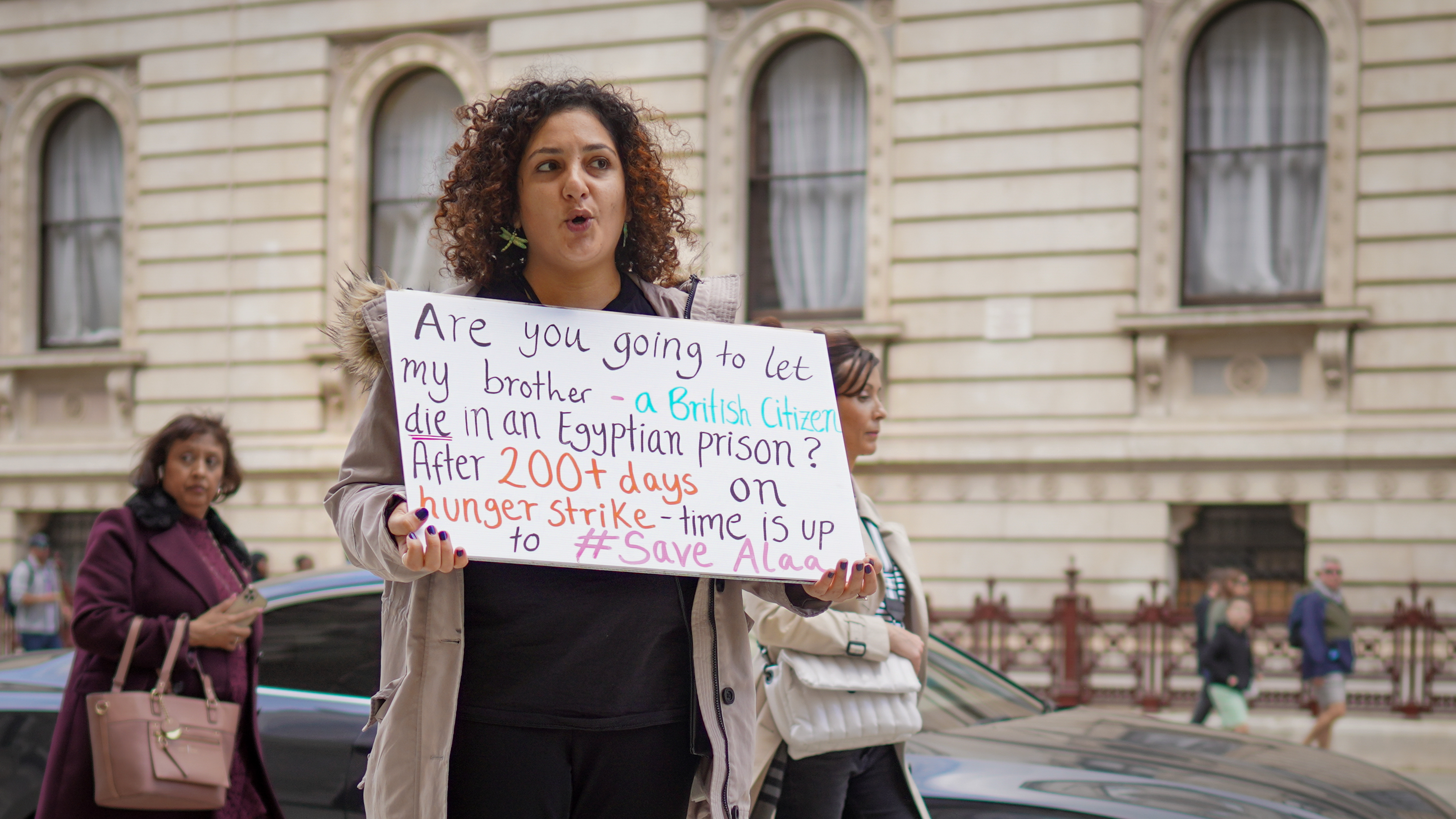
The sister of writer Alaa Abd El-Fattah protesting outside the UK's Foreign, Commonwealth and Development Office during the conference

The British-Egyptian writer and activist Alaa Abd El-Fattah, who has been imprisoned for most of the previous nine years for his activism and criticism of Egypt's government, had been on hunger strike since late October, and his case has become a central topic at COP27, especially after he reportedly stopped drinking water at the beginning of the summit. International pressure mounted on Egypt to release him: several world leaders, including British Prime Minister Rishi Sunak and German Chancellor Olaf Scholz, raised his case directly with Egyptian President Abdel Fattah el-Sisi, and Volker Türk, United Nations human rights chief, also urged Egypt to release him and other political prisoners. Abd El-Fattah rose to prominence in Egypt's 2011 uprising.

At a news conference held by Sanaa Seif, sister of Abd El-Fattah, Egyptian parliament member Amr Darwish confronted the speaker from the audience and was escorted out of the room by United Nations security officers. Representatives of nongovernmental groups at the conference threatened to walk out if the activist dies. Seif told reporters, "I urge President Biden to do something, whatever way out that is needed."

==== Protests during the conference ====
On 15 November 2022, Polish climate activists Dominika Lasota and Wiktoria Jędroszkowiak, and Ukrainian activists Svitlana Romanko, Valeria Bondarieva and Viktoriya Ball protested during a session held by Russians, whose 150-person delegation included 33 fuel lobbyists. The activists called out to the Russian delegation, stating that the Russians were war criminals with no right to be present at the conference. Lasota called the Russians "despicable" (Polish: podłymi) and held up a banner "Fossil Fuels Kill". The activists were forced out by security personnel. Justin Rowlatt of BBC News was also removed from the Russian session by security personnel after he asked the Russian delegation, "Do you plan to compensate for the damage made to the natural environment in Ukraine?".

== See also ==
- 2022 in climate change
- Climate change in Egypt
- Global Assembly

== Sources ==
- Farand, Chloé (2022-11-20). "What was decided at Cop27 climate talks in Sharm el-Sheikh?". Climate Home News.
- "COP27: Key outcomes agreed at the UN climate talks in Sharm el-Sheikh". Carbon Brief. 2022-11-21.
