= ECIU =

ECIU can refer to:

- European Consortium of Innovative Universities
- Energy and Climate Intelligence Unit, a non-profit organisation based in the United Kingdom which researches energy and climate change issues.
