= Ewingar State Forest =

Plantation forest in New South Wales, Australia

Ewingar State Forest is a plantation forest in northern New South Wales, approximately 36km east of Tenterfield. It encompasses 18,433 hectares of what was formerly Crown forestry land. It was acquired by the Forestry Corporation of NSW, a State Government agency, on 14 December 2022.

In 2025, there was a 137 hectare bush fire.

The Forest includes the habitat of the endangered (and adorable) Greater glider(s).

== See also ==
- 2022 in the environment
