= Climate change in Egypt =

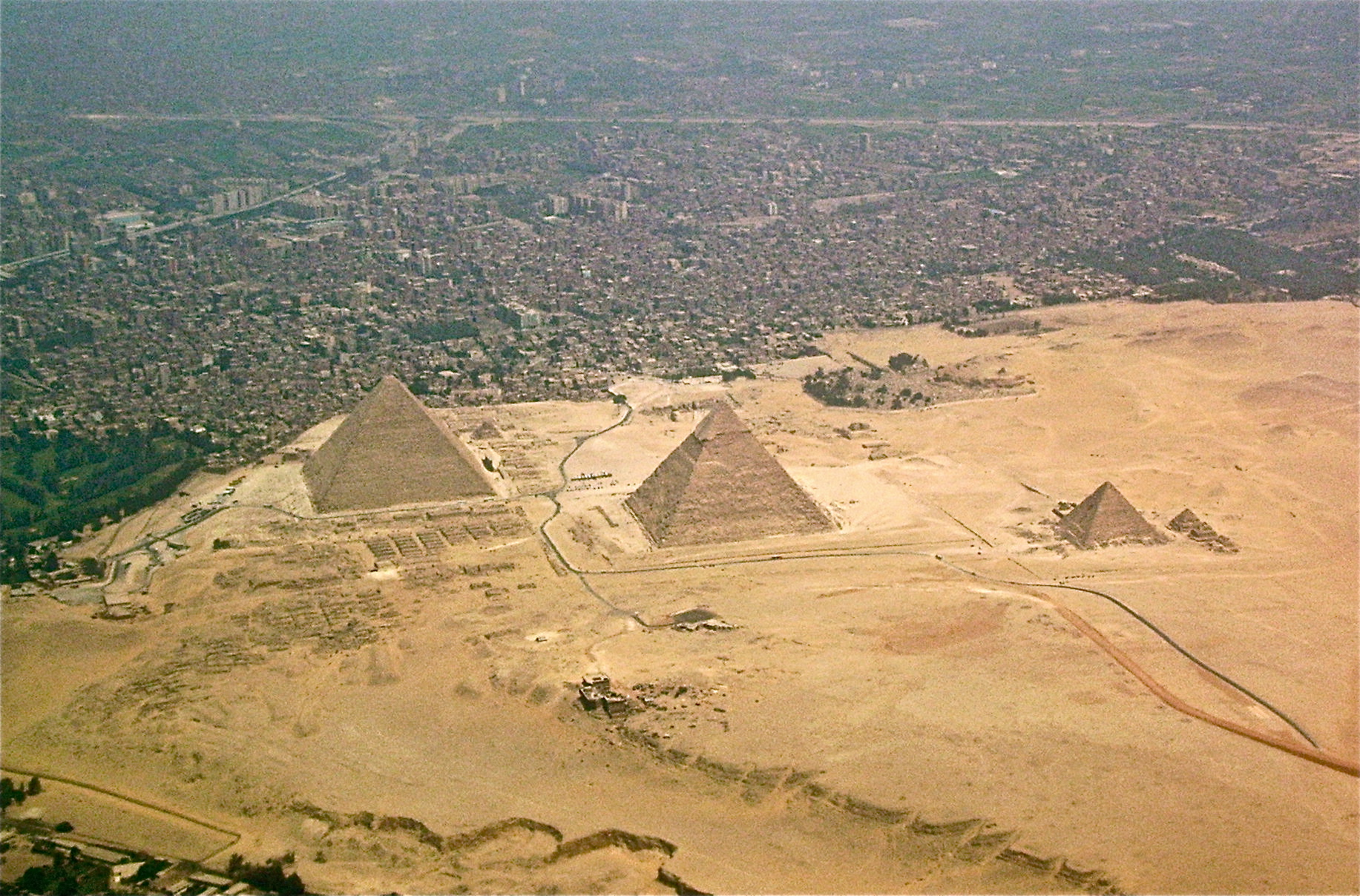
Egypt's Pyramids near Cairo, showing the proximity of the large urban population to the desert

Climate change is causing Egypt's already hot and arid climate to experience environmental stresses including extreme temperatures, droughts, floods, and sea level rise. As a highly vulnerable nation to climate change, these extreme conditions will have significant impacts on the lives of Egyptians due to resulting food insecurity, water scarcity, health and economic impacts.

Egypt has signed and ratified the Paris Agreement, as well as submitted a nationally determined contribution (NDC) which sets priority areas as sustainability of agriculture, water resources, the environment, energy, and land management.

Egypt is located on the northeast of the continent of Africa. The population was 102.3 million in 2020 and is projected to grow to 159.9 million by 2050.

== Greenhouse gas emissions ==
Despite experiencing some of the most significant impacts of climate change, Egypt has not been a primary contributor of the greenhouse gasses that have caused climate change. Based on 2020 data Egypt accounts for only 0.63% of global greenhouse gas emissions. However Climate Trace estimates 2022 emissions at 440 million tonnes CO2eq, which is 0.75% of their estimated global total of 58.37 billion tonnes.

== Climate change impacts ==
=== Temperature and weather changes ===
Köppen climate classification map for Egypt for 1980–2016

2071–2100 map under the most intense climate change scenario. Mid-range scenarios are currently considered more likely.

Egypt's climate is hot, dry, and dominated by desert. Egypt has a hot summer from May to October and a mild winter from November to April. In the desert, summer temperatures can range from a high of 43 °C (109 °F) during the day to 7 °C (45 °F) at night and winter temperatures range from 18 °C (64 °F) to 0 °C (32 °F). The coast is more mild with temperatures ranging from a high of 30 °C (86 °F) in the winter to a low of 14 °C (57 °F) in the winter.

From the years of 2000-2020, average temperature in Egypt increased by 0.38 degrees celsius per decade, a temperature increase that is higher than the world average. The projected future warming rates in the MENA region range between 0.2 °C per decade and 0.5 °C per decade. In addition, the magnitude and duration of heat waves is expected to increase. Extreme temperatures are expected to be especially prevalent in specific locations in Egypt, such as South Sinai and Aswan.

Egypt has been ranked as one of the most vulnerable countries to climate change but only 63rd for being most prepared for climate change. Egypt's increase in average temperature over the past two decades has resulted in an increase in energy needs for cooling, which will only continue to increase with further warming in the coming decades. Increasing temperatures also contribute to increasing desertification, increased drying of the Nile River, decreasing precipitation, rising sea levels, and increasing flash floods.

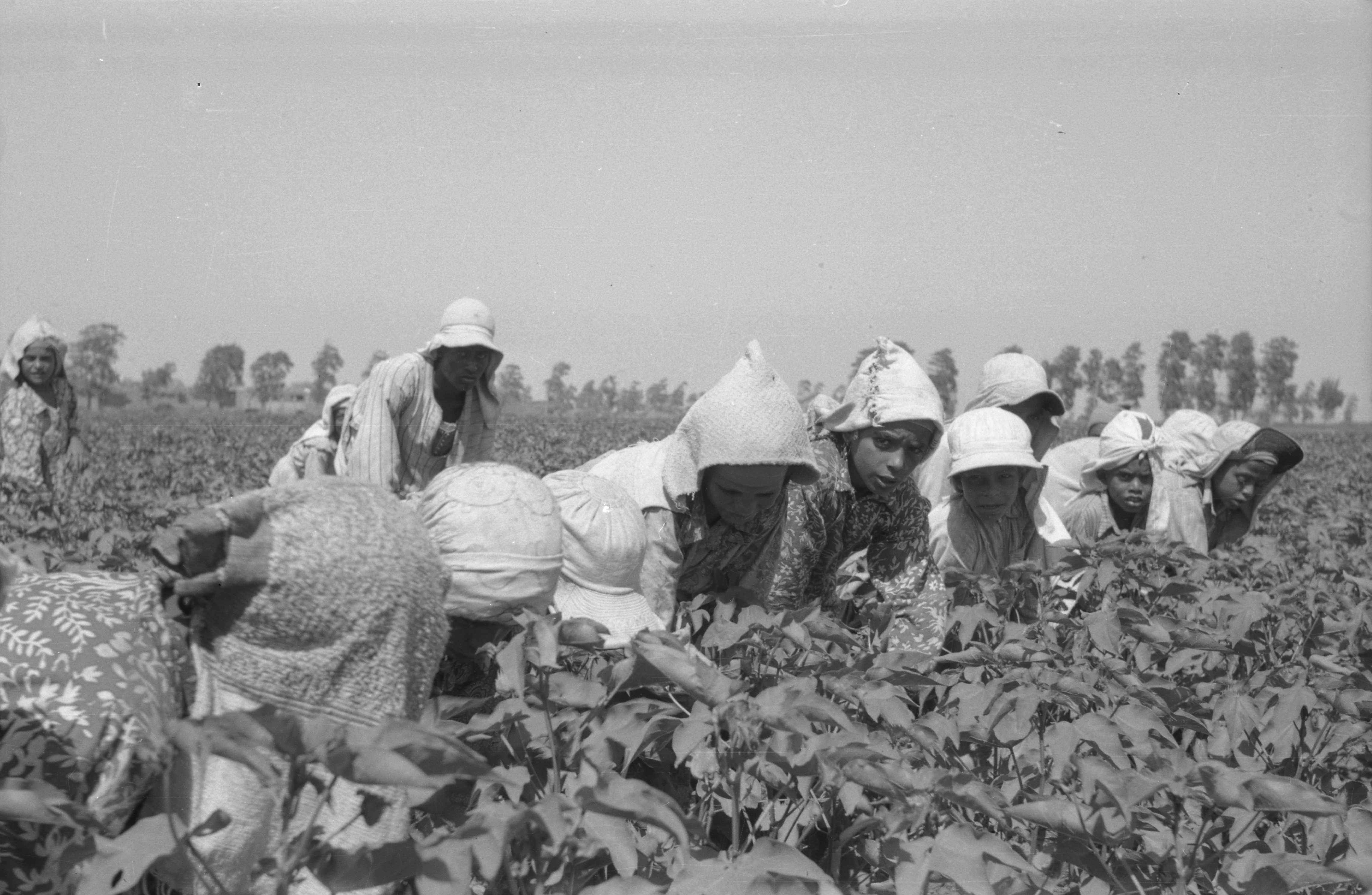
Image of the history of Egypt's Cotton Industry, which is greatly impacted by the decrease in agricultural output due to climate change

=== Agriculture ===
An Egyptian cotton field from 1950s

Even without the impacts of climate change, Egypt's arid climate makes it vulnerable for water scarcity and food scarcity. Most of Egypt does not receive much rain, thus all of its agricultural production is around the Nile River. The population of Egypt is increasing, therefore the country will require more food and water. Agriculture is important to the Egyptian economy, making up 11.3% of the GDP and providing 28% of jobs. However, climate change is creating challenges for the agricultural sector. One concern is decreasing crop production. Due to heat stress, water stress, and salinity, food crop yields are projected to decline by 10% by 2050. The crops with the largest yield declines are expected to be maize, oilseeds, sugarcrops and fruits and vegetables.

Egypt is dependent on global markets for wheat imports and food security. Egypt consumes 20.5 million tonnes of wheat a year, half of which is produced domestically with the remaining half supplied from imports. However, wheat yields in Egypt are expected to reduce nearly 20% by 2060. Other impacts of climate change on agriculture include reduced water availability, increased pests and diseases, and a shorter growing period in some places. Prices for imported food will increase as a result of climate change due to global declines in crop production. Hotter temperatures and increased drought will also impact livestock, including cows and chickens. Heat and water stress reduces milk yield and quality, egg yield, and animals' reproductive capacity. Given increases in the human populations and decreases in milk production, models predict that milk availability will decrease by 40 kg per person by 2064. Together, these climate change impacts on agriculture will threaten food security in Egypt.

==== Nile River ====
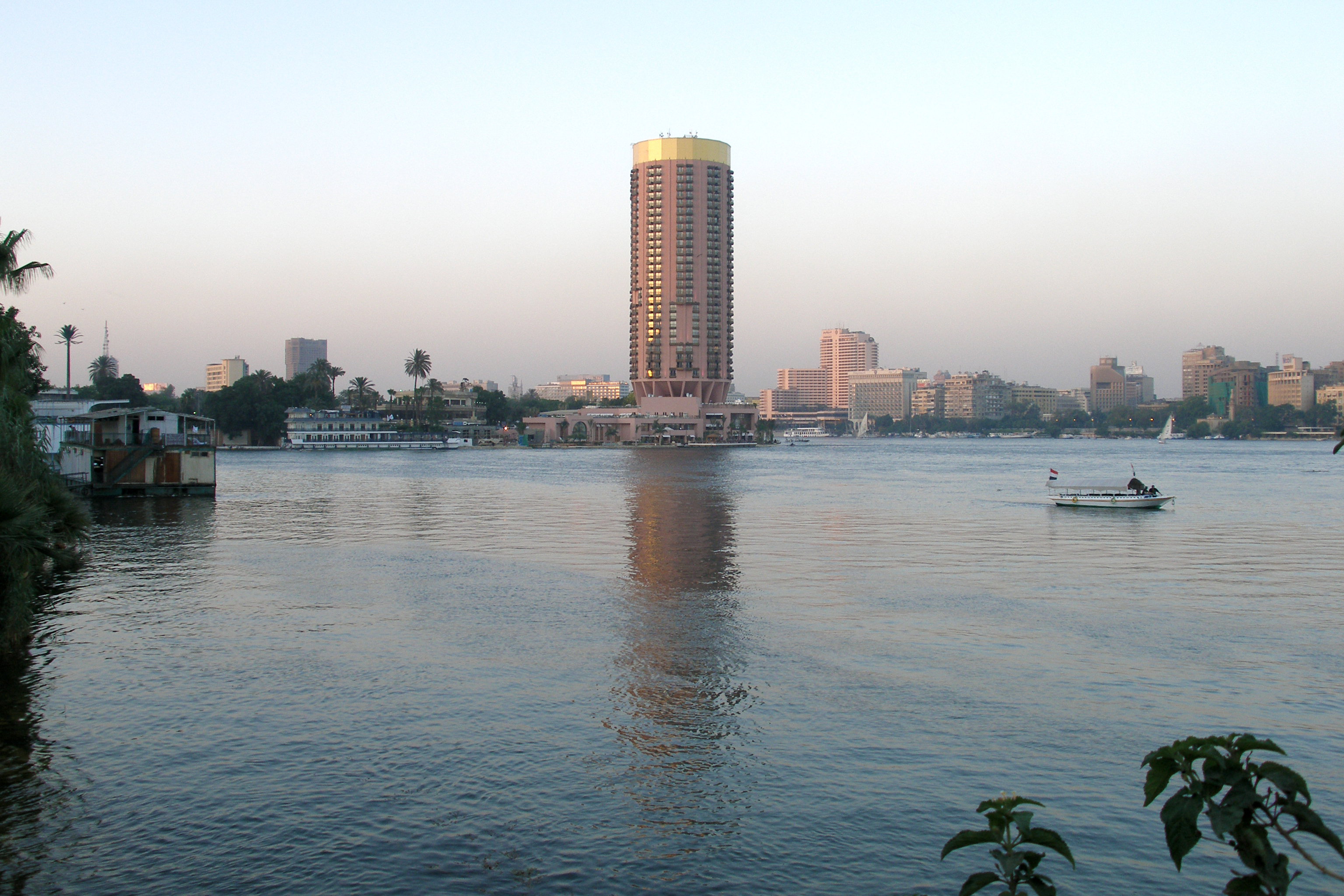
The Nile River riverfront is often very high in metropolitan areas. Areas like this could possibly flood due to climate change.

The Nile River is the main source of water, used for transportation, irrigation and hydroelectric power. More than 95% of Egypt's freshwater resources come from the Nile River. Egypt is considered a downstream country because the source of the Nile, and most of the water that contributes to it, comes from outside Egypt's borders. The Nile flows 4,100 miles beginning in Lake Victoria (located between Uganda, Tanzania, and Kenya) and emptying into the Mediterranean sea forming the Nile Delta. For thousands of years, the Nile has been critical for Egypt's agricultural sector and currently 95% of the Egyptian population live along it. The Nile is very sensitive to changes in precipitation. The number of flash floods that occur on the Nile has increased in recent years due to climate change. In April 2018, Greater Cairo was flooded by higher rates of rainfall than usual which caused power outages that lasted nearly a day. In March 2020, high rainfall combined with winds in North-Eastern Egyptian cities destroyed electricity lines. Egypt's first Nationally Determined Contributions plan estimates that sea levels could rise around the Nile Delta by over 3.5 feet by 2080-2100. Many of Egypt's current sources of energy could be greatly affected by the increased flooding of the Nile River and rising sea levels.

=== Water scarcity ===
A growing population and increasing use of water for irrigation in the agricultural sector have put a strain on Egypt's water supply. Egypt currently has an annual water deficit of about 7 billion cubic meters. Higher temperatures are straining water supply further. Water scarcity will not only decrease the amount of drinking water, but also have negative impacts on the economy, agricultural sector, child mortality rates, and overall public health. As temperatures increase due to climate change, crops will require more water, leading to more strain on the water supply. Increased evaporation will shorten the length of the growing season, which may further reduce the food supply. The decrease in the food supply is projected to increase the cost of food which will raise the rates of food insecurity across Egypt, a country in which 30% of its citizens live under the poverty line.

=== Sea level rise ===
Egypt's northern border lies along the Mediterranean coast, a region highly vulnerable to sea level rise. In Egypt, 39% of installed gas and 7% of oil power plant capacity are in low-elevation areas that are vulnerable to this threat. Alexandria, the second largest city in Egypt with a population of 5 million people, and the Nile Delta region are among the world's most vulnerable areas to climate change. According to the UN Intergovernmental Panel on Climate Change, global sea levels are predicted to rise as much as 68 cm by 2050. In north Egypt, a rise to this extent is likely to cause flooding in parts of Alexandria, saltwater intrusion into groundwater, salinization in farmland, and ultimately, displacement of people and the loss of livelihoods. A sea level rise of 50 cm by 2050 could displace 2-4 million Egyptians from coastal zones.

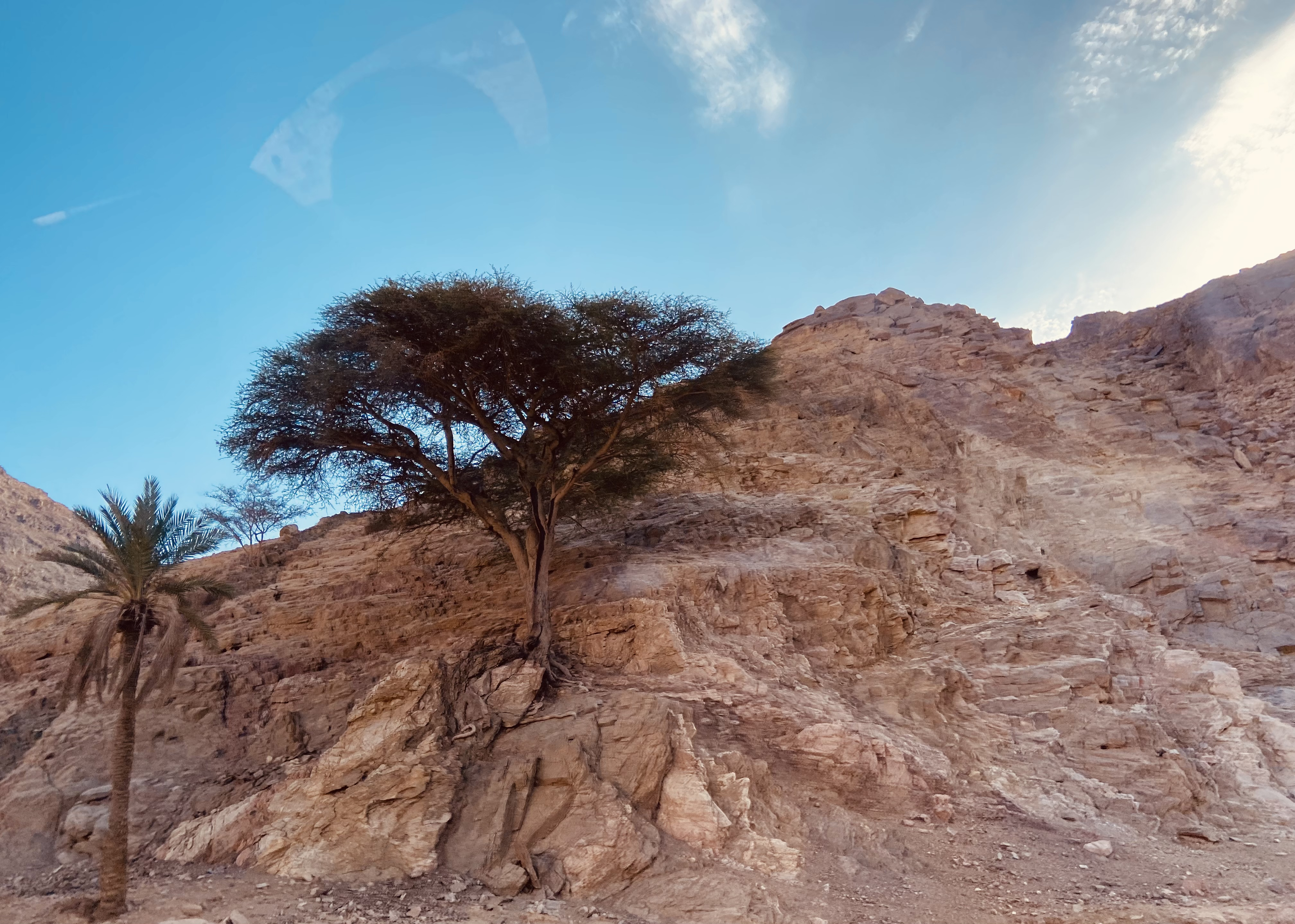
Image of Egypt's desert ecosystem

=== Ecosystems ===
While water resources can be protected through mitigating measures in many circumstances, this is not the case of the Nile River and its deltas. Lake Burullus is the second largest shallow lagoon connected to the Nile Delta and has been a nationally protected area since 1998. It is located between the Damietta and Rosetta branches of the Nile and used to receive large quantities of agricultural drainage water. Climate change is expected to increase the temperature and salinity of Lake Burullus, threatening the ecosystem. Other lake ecosystems throughout Egypt are also negatively affected by climate change. Lake Qarun and Lake Manzallah have experienced higher levels of water evaporation and increases in salinity. Climate change has also caused changes in the chemical properties of the rivers, making them more vulnerable to invasive species such as the red swamp crayfish. This crayfish thrives in the changed ecosystem of the rivers and is harmful to native species.

== Impacts on people ==
=== Economic impacts ===
Climate change will have severe negative impacts on Egypt's economy. In the agriculture sector, climate change will impact the country's domestic food supply as well as agricultural exports. Domestic food crop yields are projected to decline by 10% by 2050. Compounding the issue, global reductions of crop yields are projected to increase world food prices and these higher prices are projected to affect demand for Egypt's exports. For example, fruit and vegetable exports are expected to decline by 4.6 million mt. Climate change will also affect other sections of the economy, including Egypt's ceramic industry, which is the largest in continental Africa. Ceramics are a clay based industry and sensitive to climate-related extreme events and droughts due to raw materials used. Changing weather patterns and flooding are disrupting the production of ceramics.

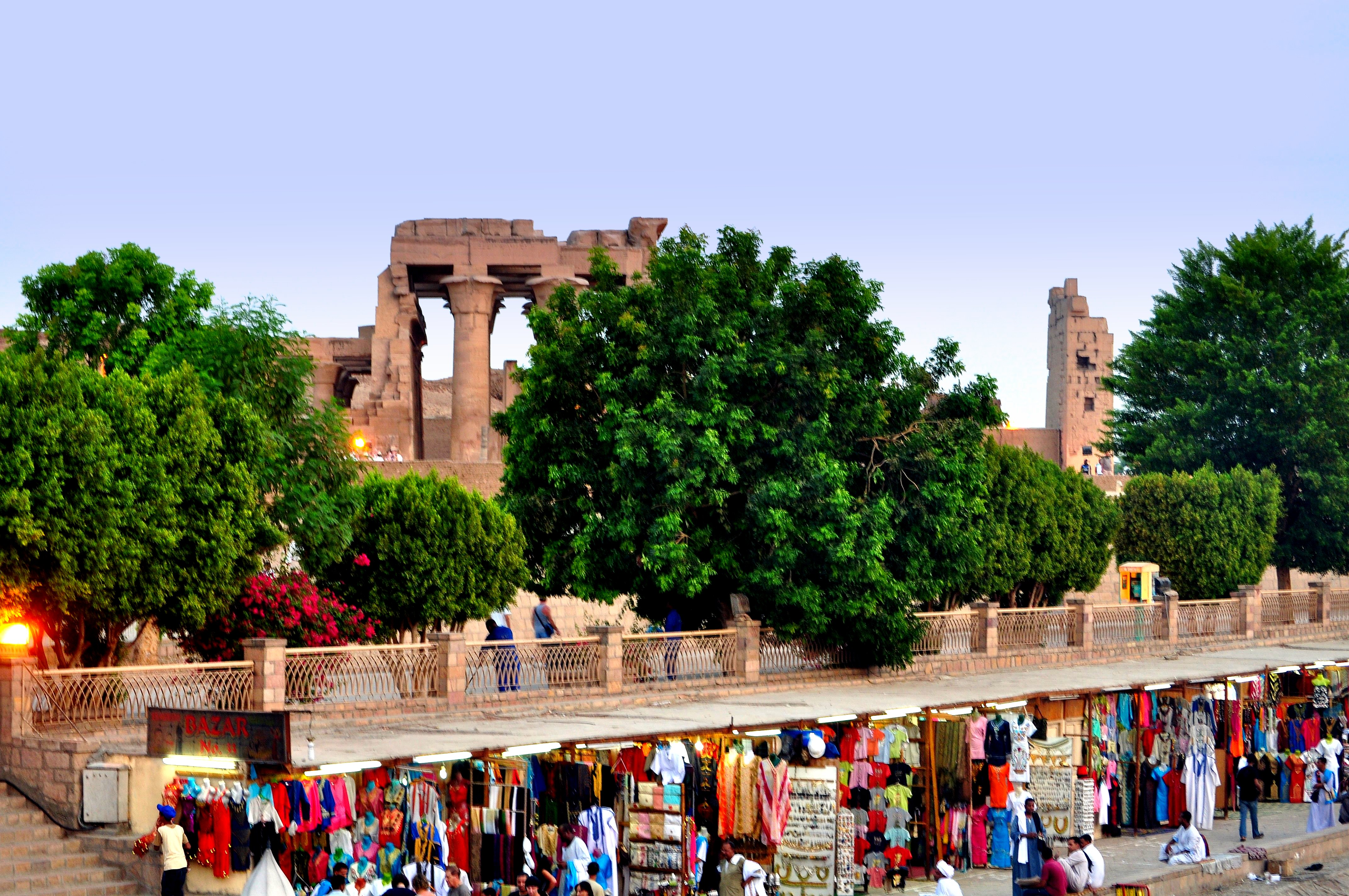
Tourism in the Nile

=== Tourism ===
Tourism accounts for 10-15% of Egypt's economy. Since tourism is influenced by weather conditions and the environment, climate change is going to have a significant impact on tourism. The number of tourists visiting Egypt is projected to decline about 20% by 2060. Coastal tourism is especially dependent on the environment, and thus will be greatly affected by climate change. Sea level rise as a result of climate change is expected to reduce the amount of beaches, damage coastal infrastructure, and reduce the appeal of tourist destinations. Temperatures may also increase to an extent that will be unsuitable for vacationers.

=== Health ===
Children will be profoundly impacted by climate change despite contributing to it the least. By 2050, child mortality in Egypt is projected to increase by around 2.3%, even if the Paris Agreement target of limiting the global temperature increase to 1.5 °C is met. In higher warming scenarios, child mortality is expected to increase even more. Extreme weather events and floods can damage crucial infrastructure, such as water and sanitation. Lack of access to clean water can lead to many diseases that put children particularly at risk, including cholera. Children are also more vulnerable than adults to toxic substances, such as lead and other pollutants, that can be found in untreated water. Heat stress and increased particulate matter concentrations will also have negative health impacts, and may result in about 2,000-5,000 more deaths a year.

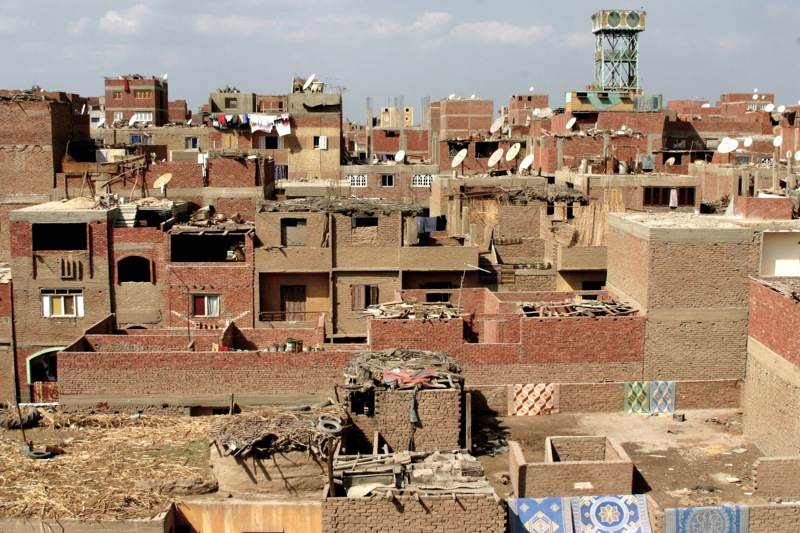
Image of impoverished urban areas within Egypt. The population of the Middle East, Egypt included, is only increasing and thus with climate change potentially creating problems with housing it is likely that impoverished urban areas like this will grow.

=== Housing ===
It is expected that nearly 6 million Egyptian people will be displaced due to flooding as a result of sea level rise. In a one-meter sea level rise scenario, 7 cities and 30 towns will be affected and 35,500 acres of urban land and 920,000 acres of agricultural land will be at risk for flooding.

== Mitigation ==
Similar to much of the Middle East, Egypt receives a lot of sunlight and has high wind speeds making it a great place to build renewable energy plants. Unlike most countries in the Middle East though, Egypt is large in landmass. Egypt joined the Paris Agreement, had its first Nationally Determined Contributions (NDC) completed in 2017, and updated the NDC in 2022. The NDC's financial needs are currently set at $50 Billion in order to complete its sustainability goals. They are set on a sectoral level, reducing greenhouse gas emissions by 33% in electricity, 65% in oil and gas, and 7% in transportation. In 2022, they also released a National Climate Change Strategy (NCCS). The NCCS has 4 main aims. The first is the analysis of strengths and weaknesses of Egypt's climate change adaptability. Its goal is to achieve sustainable economic growth. It also emphasizes the importance of governance, improvements in infrastructure, technology, research, and general management capabilities. The NCCS has 22 sub-targets, including the preservation of state assets, the ecosystem, and an emphasis on women's equality. Women are disproportionately affected by climate change, specifically in rural areas. The goals of the agricultural sector are to protect land, build technology that can warn farmers of dangerous conditions (e.g. water shortage), promote intercropping, and increase livestock production. The transportation sector is the largest contributor to Egypt's greenhouse gas emissions. Egypt is looking to engage in electrification. In 2016, Egypt received 100 new electric buses to service greater Cairo financed by the international community and subsequent international organizations such as the World Bank.

Egypt has utilized a command and control system. This means that the government is fining businesses who do not comply with greenhouse gas emission policies. However, this has led to little progress as businesses have found it more in their interest to accept the penalty rather than adjust their operation to fit national climate needs. Currently, renewable energy only makes up between 8-9% of energy production, with natural gas leading the way. Total "installed wind and solar power generation capacity has increased by 340 percent from 887 MegaWatts from 2015-2016 to 3,016 MegaWatts from 2019-2020." Recently, Egypt has engaged in new projects to increase renewable energy such as the Benban Solar Park, Assuit Hydropower plant, Kom Ombo Solar power plant, Gabal El-Zeit wind power plant and the Al-Dabaa Nuclear power plant.

=== Adaptation ===
Egypt launched a National Adaptation Plan (NAP) in 2011. NAP aims to reduce vulnerability to climate change by equipping the government with information on climate risks and support adaptation planning. Current initiatives are managed under the National Climate Change Strategy 2050 (NCCS) that was created in 2022 as a reference document that consolidates all aspects of climate change. The five priorities listed in the document are sustainable economic growth, improving resilience to climate change, enhancing climate action governance, enhancing climate financing infrastructure, and enhancing research, technology, and awareness. For the implementation of climate adaptation plans, the government has financial support from SCALA and the Green Climate Fund (GCF). Also, USAID provides assistance programs that support small businesses, especially those owned by women, and helps them improve resilience to climate change impacts.

=== Carbon credits ===
In August 2025, the Egyptian Government announced that it is planning to begin issuing carbon credits to renewable energy projects in the country.

== Society and culture ==
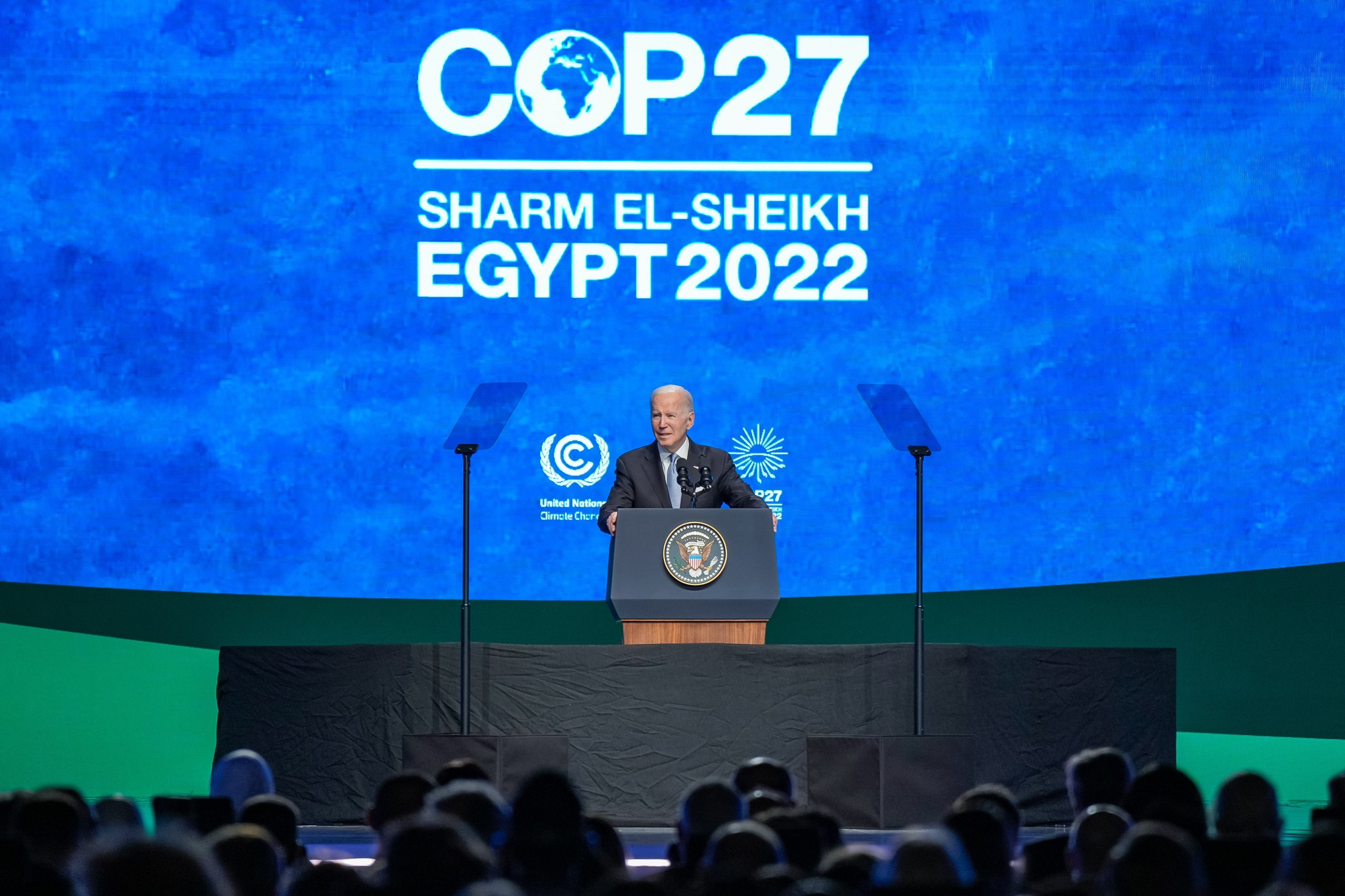
Image of COP27 in Egypt

=== Activism ===
In 2022, Egypt hosted COP 27 talks. At COP27, UNICEF promoted the idea that climate change should be recognized as a crisis for the rights and wellbeing of children. They also did this in order to increase children's participation in climate mitigation processes. However, there were questions about the selection of Egypt as a host, due to concerns about Egypts human rights and environmental policies. While COP 27 was taking place, there were protests taking place throughout Egypt about climate issues. Some of these protests were calling for climate reparations and demanding that wealthy, developed countries largely responsible for climate change pay developing countries for the consequences of climate change they will disproportionately deal with.
