= 2022 in climate change =

This article documents events, research findings, scientific and technological advances, and human actions to measure, predict, mitigate, and adapt to the effects of global warming and climate change—during the year 2022.

== Summaries ==
Delay means death

Nearly half of humanity is living in the danger zone—now. Many ecosystems are at the point of no return—now. Unchecked carbon pollution is forcing the world's most vulnerable on a frog march to destruction—now. The facts are undeniable. This abdication of leadership is criminal. The world's biggest polluters are guilty of arson of our only home. ... Today's report underscores two core truths. First, coal and other fossil fuels are choking humanity. (Second,) investments in adaptation work. ... Delay means death.

— António Guterres, Secretary-General of the United Nations
28 February 2022
- ~22 January: the International Monetary Fund stated that "Much larger coordinated global policies—including carbon price floors—will be needed to meet the new goals laid out at the (Nov 2021) Glasgow climate conference and stave off catastrophic global climate change. ... Such national-level measures will need to be reinforced with adequately resourced multilateral climate finance initiatives to ensure that all countries can invest in needed mitigation and adaptation measures."
- 13 September: The United in Science 2022 report is published by the WMO, summarizing latest climate science-related updates and assessing recent climate change mitigation progress as "going in the wrong direction".
- 26 October: At the 30th anniversary of the World Scientists' Warning to Humanity, scientists in a BioScience study concluded that "We are now at 'code red' on planet Earth", presenting new or updated information about "recent climate-related disasters, assess[ed] planetary vital signs, and [...] policy recommendations".
- The Global Carbon Project reports that carbon emissions in 2022 remain at record levels, with no sign of the decrease that is needed to limit global warming to 1.5 °C. At the current rate, the carbon that can still be emitted while still meeting the 1.5 °C global goal will likely (at a 50% chance) be emitted within only around nine years.

== Measurements and statistics ==
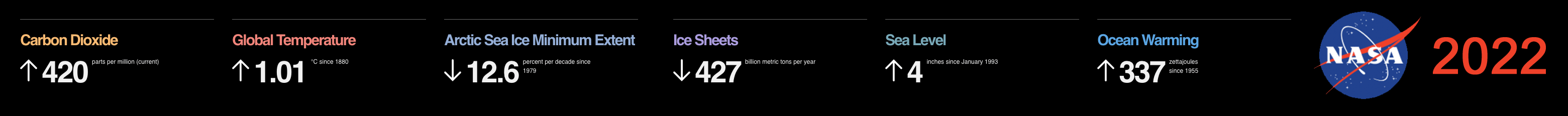
"Vital Signs of the Planet" as presented by NASA on 31 December 2022

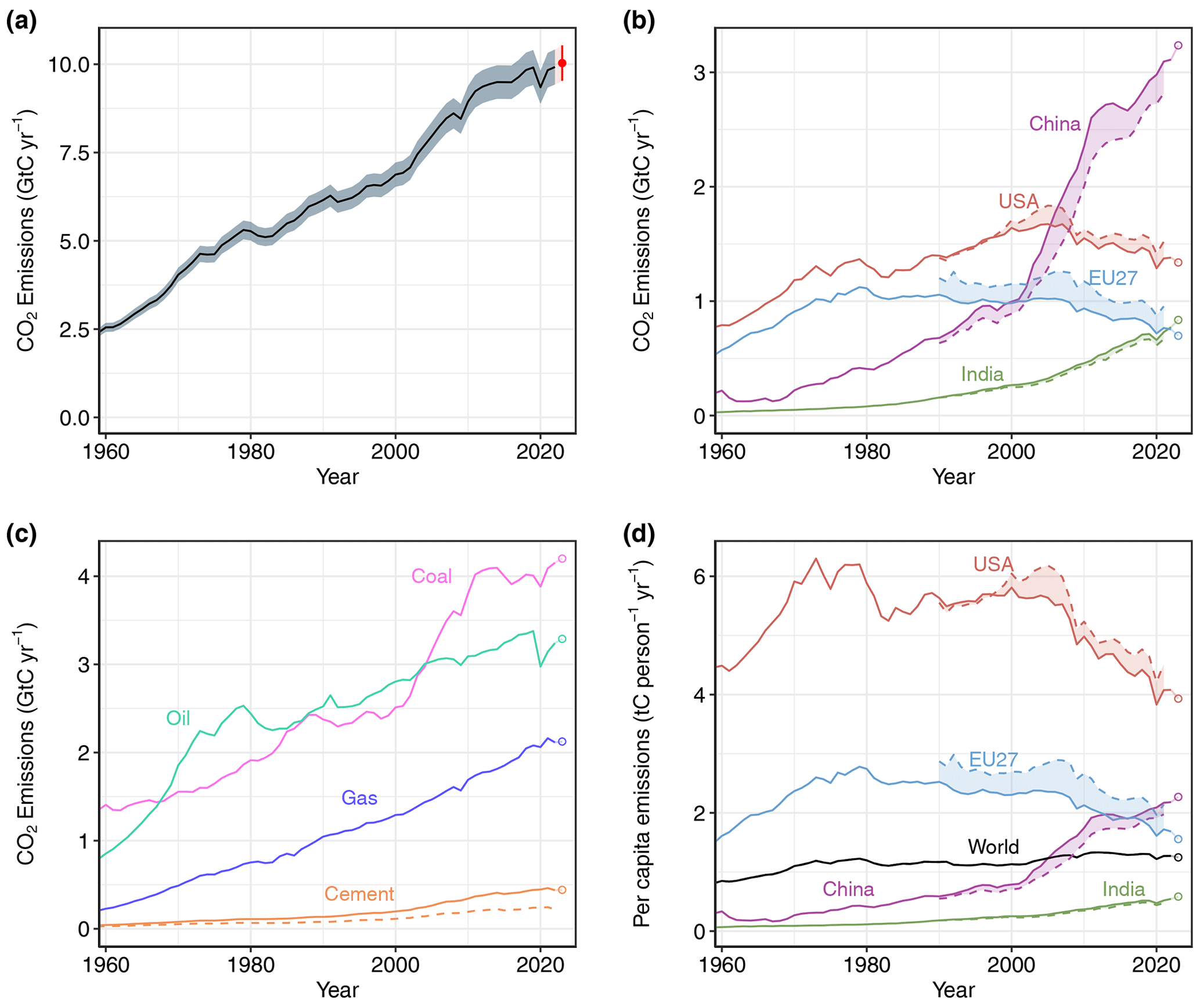
Carbon emissions through 2022

- 13 January: Australia matched its hottest reliably recorded temperature near the West Australian town of Onslow, registering 50.7 °C (123.3 °F).
- February: the 2022 Winter Olympics in Beijing was the first to rely 100% on artificial snow, exceeding Pyeongchang (2018, 90%) and Sochi (2014, 80%). If global warming continue the trajectory of the preceding two decades, by 2100 the winter games were predicted to be unviable at 20 of 21 former host venues.
- 1 February: a study published in PLOS Climate reported that, in 2019, 57% of the global ocean surface recorded extreme heat, compared to 2% during the Second Industrial Revolution, and that, between the 1980s and 2010s, the global mean normalized heat index increased by 68.23%. Researchers stated that "many parts of the subtropical and midlatitude regions have reached a near-permanent extreme warming state".
- 14 February: a study published in Nature Climate Change concluded that the southwestern North American megadrought that began in 2000 was the driest 22-year period in southwestern North America since at least 800 CE, and forecast that this megadrought would very likely persist through 2022, matching the duration of a late-1500s megadrought.
- 7 March: researchers report in Nature Climate Change that more than three-quarters of the Amazon rainforest has been losing resilience due to deforestation and climate change since the early 2000s as measured by recovery-time from short-term perturbations ("critical slowing down" (CSD)), reinforcing the theory that it is approaching a critical transition. On March 11, INPE reports satellite data that show record-high levels of Amazon deforestation in Brazil for a February (199 km^{2}).
- 15 March: a Global Energy Monitor report based on mine-level data and modeling determined that coal mining emits 52.3 million tonnes of methane per year, rivaling oil (39 million tonnes) and gas (45 million tonnes), and comparable to the climate impact of the CO_{2} emissions of all coal plants in China.
- 24 March: a study published in Frontiers in Forests and Global Change review the biophysical mechanisms by which forests influence climate, showing that beyond 50°N large scale deforestation leads to a net global cooling, that tropical deforestation leads to substantial warming from non-CO_{2}-impacts, and that standing tropical forests help cool the average global temperature by more than 1 °C.

Reported in 2022: wind and solar power reached a record 10% of global electricity in 2021. Shown: 20 leading countries.

- 30 March: Ember's Global Electricity Review reported that in 2021, wind and solar power reached a record 10% of global electricity, with clean power being 38% of supply, more than coal's 36%. However, demand growth rebounded, leading to a record rise in coal power and emissions.
- 7 April: NOAA reported an annual increase in global atmospheric methane of 17 parts per billion (ppb) in 2021—averaging 1,895.7 ppb in that year—the largest annual increase recorded since systematic measurements began in 1983. The increase during 2020 was 15.3 ppb, itself a record increase.
- 12 April: a study of 2020 storms of at least tropical storm-strength published in Nature Communications concluded that human-induced climate change increased extreme 3-hourly storm rainfall rates by 10%, and extreme 3-day accumulated rainfall amounts by 5%. For hurricane-strength storms, the figures increased to 11% and 8%.
- 26 April: The Global Carbon Budget 2021 (published in Earth System Science Data) concludes that fossil CO_{2} emissions rebounded by around +4.8% relative to 2020 emissions – returning to 2019 levels, identifies three major issues for improving reliable accuracy of monitoring, shows that China and India surpassed 2019 levels (by 5.7% and 3.2%) while the EU and the US stayed beneath 2019 levels (by 5.3% and 4.5%), quantifies various changes and trends, for the first time provides models' estimates that are linked to the official country GHG inventories reporting, and shows that the remaining carbon budget at 1. Jan 2022 for a 50% likelihood to limit global warming to 1.5 °C is 120 GtC (420 GtCO_{2}) – or 11 years of 2021 emissions levels.
- 26 April: Scientists propose and preliminarily evaluate in Nature Reviews Earth & Environment a likely transgressed planetary boundary for green water in the water cycle, measured by root-zone soil moisture deviation from Holocene variability. A study published one day earlier in Earth's Future integrates "green water" along with "blue water" into an index to measure and project water scarcity in agriculture for climate change scenarios.
- 27 April: the second edition of the United Nations Convention to Combat Desertification's Global Land Outlook concluded that "humans have already transformed more than 70% of the Earth's land area from its natural state, causing unparalleled environmental degradation and contributing significantly to global warming".
- May: the Great Barrier Reef Marine Park Authority reported that a March 2022 aerial survey of the park indicated that 91% of the coral reefs showed "some bleaching", with bleaching patterns "largely consistent with the spatial distribution of heat stress accumulation".

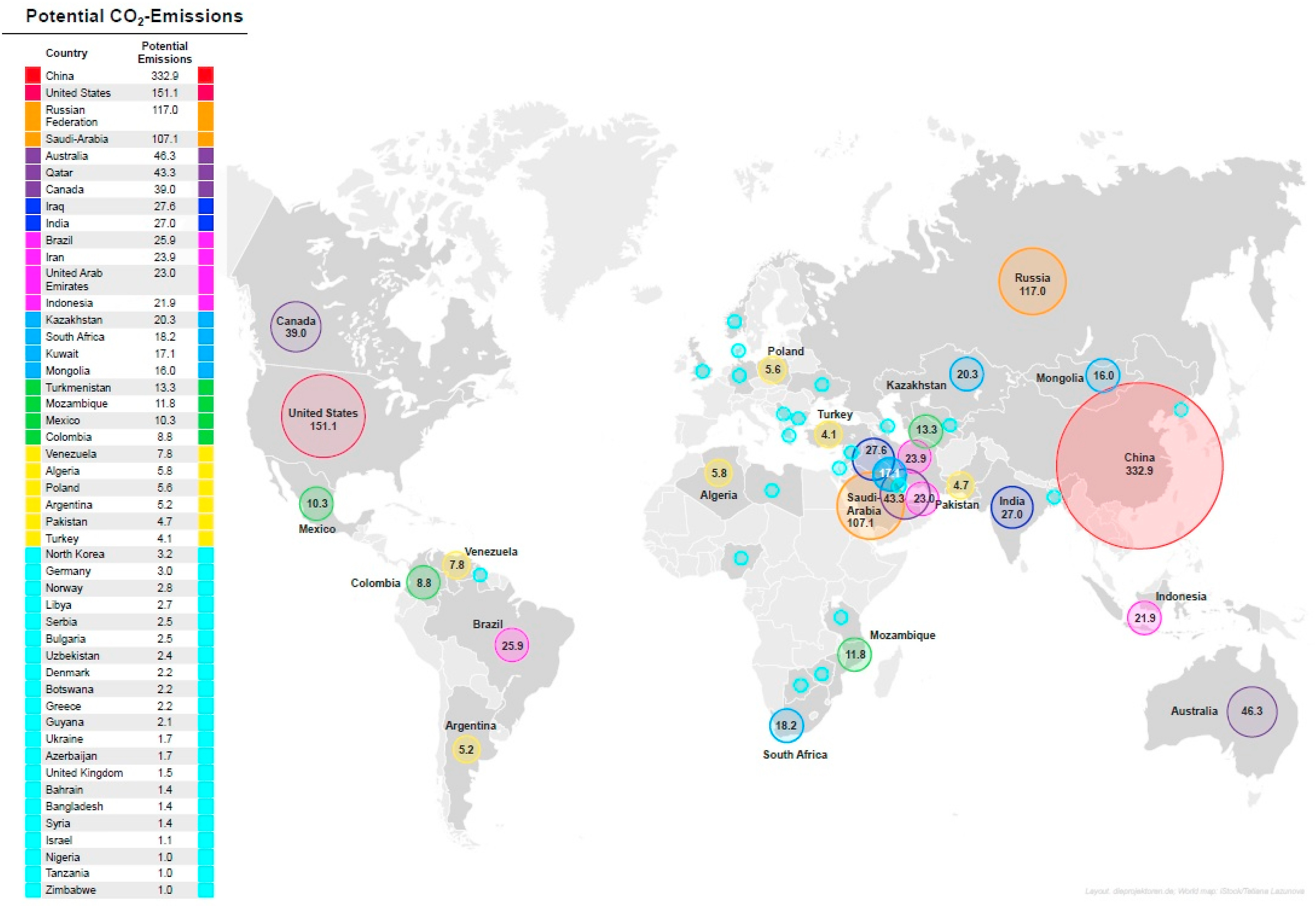
12 May: Researchers identify the 425 biggest fossil fuel extraction projects globally, 40% of which haven't yet started extraction, that threaten climate change mitigation of global climate goals.

- 12 May: researchers identify the 425 biggest fossil fuel extraction projects globally, of which 40% as of 2020 are new projects that haven't yet started extraction. They conclude in the Energy Policy study that "defusing" these "carbon bombs" would be necessary for climate change mitigation of global climate goals. On 17 May, a separate study in Environmental Research Letters finds that "staying within a 1.5 °C carbon budget (50% probability) implies leaving almost 40% of 'developed reserves' of fossil fuels unextracted". On 26 May, a study in Nature Climate Change calculates climate policies-induced future lost financial profits from global stranded fossil-fuel assets.
- 26 May: a study in Nature Climate Change reveals that storms in the Southern Hemisphere have already reached intensity levels previously predicted to occur only in the year 2080.
- 3 June: the NOAA reports that the global concentration of carbon dioxide in Earth's atmosphere is now 50% greater than in pre-industrial times, and is likely at a level last seen 4.1 to 4.5 million years ago, at 421 parts per million (ppm).
- 20 June: a study in Nature Food suggests global food miles CO_{2} emissions are 3.5–7.5 times higher than previously estimated, with transport accounting for about 19% of total food-system emissions, albeit shifting towards plant-based diets remains substantially more important.
- 25 June: a study published in Geophysical Research Letters indicates that the Arctic is warming four times faster than global warming now, substantially faster than current CMIP6 models could project.
- 13 July: A study in Nature affirms (see 7 March) that critical slowing down indicators suggest that tropical, arid and temperate forests are substantially losing resilience. On 4 July, Brazil's INPE reports that the country's regions of the Amazon rainforest have been deforested by a record amount in the first half of 2022.
- 18 July: a study in Global Change Biology shows that climate change-related exceptional marine heatwaves in the Mediterranean Sea during 2015–2019 resulted in widespread mass sealife die-offs in five consecutive years.
- 8 August: a study published in Nature Climate Change found that 58% of infectious diseases confronted by humanity have been at times aggravated by climatic hazards, and that empirical cases revealed 1,006 unique pathways in which climatic hazards led to pathogenic diseases.
- 22 August: a study published in The Cryosphere estimated that 51.5 ±8.0% of Swiss glacier volume was lost between 1931 and 2016, finding that low-elevation, high-debris-cover, and gently sloping glacier termini are conducive to particularly high mass losses.
- 1 September: a study published in Nature estimated the social cost of carbon (Note: From Rennert et al.: "The social cost of carbon dioxide (SC-CO_{2}) measures the monetized value of the damages to society caused by an incremental metric tonne of CO_{2} emissions and is a key metric informing climate policy.) (SCC) to be $185 per tonne of CO_{2}—3.6 times higher than the U.S. government's then current value of $51 per tonne.
- 3 September: for the first time on record, temperatures at the summit of the Greenland ice sheet exceeded the melting point in September.
- 29 September: a study published in Science reported that the Arctic Ocean experienced acidification rates three to four times higher than in other ocean basins, attributing the acidification to reduced sea ice coverage on a decadal time scale. Reduced sea ice coverage exposes seawater to the atmosphere and promotes rapid uptake of atmospheric carbon dioxide, leading to sharp declines in pH.
- 29 September: A study published in Science adds to the accumulating research showing that oil and gas industry methane emissions are much larger than thought.
- 5 October: a study published by World Weather Attribution concluded that, for the Northern Hemisphere extratropics in 2022, human-induced climate change made drought 20 times worse for root zone soil moisture, and 5 times worse for surface soil moisture.
- 25 October: The Lancet published a report stating that transitioning to clean energy and improved energy efficiency can prevent 1.2 million annual deaths resulting from exposure to fossil fuel-derived PM_{2·5} particulates, and that extreme heat due to climate change accounted for an estimated 98 million more people reporting moderate to severe food insecurity in 2020 than the 1981–2010 average.
- 28 October: a study published in Science Advances estimated that from 1992 to 2013, cumulative global losses due to extreme heat were more than US$16 trillion (likely range: $5–29.3 trillion), also finding that human-caused increases in heat waves depressed economic output most in the poor tropical regions least culpable for warming.
- 9 November: The largest global inventory and interactive map of greenhouse gas emission sources is released by Climate TRACE.
- 11 November: a study published in Earth System Science Data estimated that global carbon dioxide emissions from fossil fuels and cement increased by 1.0% in 2022, hitting a new record high of 36.6 billion tonnes of carbon dioxide (GtCO_{2}).
- December: Christian Aid's Counting the cost 2022: a year of climate breakdown reported climate-related losses for Pakistan flooding ($30 billion), U.S./Cuba Hurricane Ian ($100 billion), Europe/UK heatwaves ($20 billion), with each of the top ten costing at least $3 billion.
- * 26 January 2023: Bloomberg NEF's "Energy Transition Investment Trends" report estimated that, for the first time, energy transition investment matched global fossil fuel investment—$1.1 trillion in 2022, including China with $546 billion, the US with $141 billion, and the EU if treated as a bloc, $180 billion.
- 29 August 2023: an International Renewable Energy Agency (IRENA) publication stated that ~86% (187 GW) of renewable capacity added in 2022 had lower costs than electricity generated from fossil fuels.
- 28 October 2025: The Lancet estimated that in 2022, 2.52 million deaths globally were attributable to ambient air pollution from burning fossil fuels.

== Natural events and phenomena ==
Each of 2022's costliest climate-related disasters cost at least $3 billion.

- 10 March: results of a 22-month study reported in Nature Portfolio's Scientific Reports indicated that several species of coral can survive and cope with future ocean conditions (temperature and acidity) consistent with then-current (late 2021) commitments under the 2015 Paris Climate Agreement, "provid(ing) hope for future reef ecosystem function globally".
- Reported in March: a coral bleaching event caused severe bleaching in 60 percent of the corals in Australia's Great Barrier Reef, in the reef's first such event occurring in a La Niña (cooling) year.
- 28 April: a study published in Nature stated that climate and land use change will produce novel opportunities for transmission of viruses between previously geographically isolated species of wildlife, so that species will aggregate in new combinations to drive new cross-species transmission of their viruses an estimated 4,000 times. The study concluded that holding warming under 2 °C within the century would not reduce future viral sharing.
- 27 June: with a small catalog of unknown bacteria, researchers suggest, in a Nature Biotechnology study, work on microbes soon to be released from melting glaciers across the world to identify and understand potential threats in advance and understand extremophiles.
- 28 June: A review in Environmental Research: Climate elucidates the current state of climate change extreme event attribution science, concluding probabilities and costs-severity of links as well as identifying potential ways for its improvement.
- 4 July: scientists report in Nature Communications that heatwaves in western Europe are increasing "three-to-four times faster compared to the rest of the northern midlatitudes over the past 42 years" and that certain atmospheric dynamical changes can (partly) explain their increase.
- 25 August: a study published in Scientific Reports concluded that the 2019–2020 Australian wildfires caused an abrupt rise in global mean lower stratosphere temperatures and extended the duration of the Antarctic ozone hole, validating concerns that wildfires intensified by global warming would undo progress achieved through the Montreal Protocol in preserving the ozone layer.
- Reported 1 September: Swiss Re Institute's economic insights report stated that insured losses from floods doubled to $80 billion globally during 2011–2020 compared to the previous decade, while insurance penetration remained at about 18%.
- September: stating that climate change is already "an important threat", with "climate change and severe weather" endangering 34% of species, BirdLife International's State of the World's Birds 2022 reported that 49% of bird species worldwide have declining populations (only 6% are increasing).

== Actions, and goal statements ==
=== Science and technology ===
- 17 January: researchers published in WIREs Climate Change an argument against solar geoengineering, saying it "is not governable in a globally inclusive and just manner within the current international political system", and advocating for an International Non-Use Agreement.
- 21 January: a transport ship set sail from Australia to Japan with liquid hydrogen in its insulated hold, in what project participants claim is the first time the non-CO_{2}-emitting fuel has been transported by sea to an international market. However, the project producing the hydrogen used brown coal (lignite), a high-emitting energy source.
- March: the first wind farm in the Mediterranean Sea is being constructed near Taranto, Italy, and is designed to power 21,000 homes.
- April: Researchers publishing in the International Journal of Information Management argue that although advancements in science and technology are key in providing a solution for global warming, they also have numerous harmful impacts, including E-waste, CO_{2} emissions, and resource consumption.
- 23 May: a study in Proceedings of the National Academy of Sciences shows why decarbonization must be accompanied by strategies to reduce the levels of short-lived climate pollutants with near-term effects for climate goals.
- June: Progress in climate change mitigation (CCM) living review-like works:
  The living document-like aggregation, assessment, integration and review website Project Drawdown adds 11 new CCM solutions to its organized set of mitigation techniques. The website's modeling framework is used in a study document available in the journal Resources, Conservation and Recycling to show that metal recycling has significant potential for CCM. A revised or updated version of a major worldwide 100% renewable energy proposed plan and model is published in the journal Energy & Environmental Science.
- July: a 5 MW floating solar park was installed in the Alqueva Dam reservoir, Portugal, enabling solar power and hydroelectric energy to be combined. Separately, a German engineering firm committed to integrating an offshore floating solar farm with an offshore wind farm to use ocean space more efficiently. The projects involve "hybridization"—in which different renewable energy technologies are combined in one site.
- 1 July: Scientists show in One Earth why climate benefits from nature restoration are "dwarfed by the scale of ongoing fossil fuel emissions".
- 5 December: Lawrence Livermore National Laboratory (LLNL) achieved fusion ignition—a reaction producing more energy from nuclear fusion than laser energy used to drive it—for the first time ever, at its National Ignition Facility. The LLNL director projected that it would take "a few decades of research on the underlying technologies" to enable a clean-energy power plant to be built.

=== Political, economic, legal, and cultural actions ===
- 24 January: BBC Science Focus reported that "well over 100" countries had constitutions recognizing a human right to a healthy environment, leading to legal actions and petitions to governments.
- March: The World Bank issued the world's first wildlife conservation bond, raising $150 million and paying investors returns based on the rate of growth of black rhinoceros populations in South Africa's Addo Elephant National Park and Great Fish River Nature Reserve.
- 31 March: The first Middle East and North Africa Climate Week (MENACW 2022) concluded in Dubai, United Arab Emirates, after hosting about 4000 participants, 200 sessions, and 500 speakers from 147 countries.
- 8 April: the World Economic Forum reported that for the first time, wind and solar generated more than 10% of electricity globally in 2021, with fifty countries having crossed the 10% threshold. However, power from coal rose 9% to a new record high.
- 6 May: the Commission on Human Rights of the Philippines issued a non-binding "National Inquiry on Climate Change" stating that countries have a special duty to protect human rights in the context of climate change, and business enterprises have a responsibility, distinct from legal liability, to respect human rights.
- 27 May: energy and environment ministers from all Group of Seven countries agreed to end taxpayer funding for oil, gas and coal projects overseas.
- 12 August: The National Centers for Environmental Information publish a report called Assessing the Global Climate in July 2022, where they state an all-time record cold temperature occurred in Australia during the month. On October 7, 2022, Zack Labe, a climate scientist for the NOAA Geophysical Fluid Dynamics Laboratory released a statement and a climate report from Berkeley Earth denying the all-time record cold temperature occurred saying, "There are still no areas of record cold so far in 2022." Labe's statement also denied the record cold temperatures in Brazil, reported by the National Institute of Meteorology in May 2022, a month before the official start of winter, was also not record cold temperatures.
- 16 August: U.S. President Joe Biden signed into law the Inflation Reduction Act, which contains the largest climate investment by the U.S. federal government in history, including over $430 billion to reduce carbon emissions. The bill, passing by a 51–50 vote in the Senate, explicitly defined carbon dioxide as an air pollutant under the Clean Air Act to make the Act's EPA enforcement provisions harder to challenge in court.
- 25 August: The California Air Resources Board approved the Advanced Clean Cars II regulation that requires all new cars and light trucks sold in the state of California to be zero-emission vehicles by 2035.
- 29 August: five climate scientists, joined by a political scientist who studies social movements, wrote in Nature Climate Change to urge colleagues to commit acts of civil disobedience to counter the "grim trajectory on which the Earth is headed".
- 14 September: The WHO joins health associations and scientists in calling for a global fossil fuel non-proliferation treaty to protect lives of current and future generations.
- Late September: the United Nations Human Rights Committee declared that the Australian government violated the human rights of Indigenous Torres Strait Islanders by failing to adequately protect them from the impacts of climate change, the ruling being the first time a judicial body focused on human rights has told a government to pay for harm caused by climate change.
COP27 vs COP26 on emissions reduction

If we don't do better at emissions reduction, there's no amount of money on this planet that could do enough to address the consequences. The dramas will be without end if we don't reduce our emissions. ...
We've lost a year and we don't have a year to lose.

— Frans Timmermans
Executive VP, European Commission
for the European Green Deal
22 November 2022
- 29 September: Global Witness reported that, in the past decade, more than 1,700 land and environmental defenders were killed, about one every two days. Brazil, Colombia, Philippines, and Mexico were the deadliest countries.
- 27 October: the International Energy Agency's World Energy Outlook 2022 stated that Russia's invasion of Ukraine "can be a historic turning point towards a cleaner and more secure energy system thanks to the unprecedented response from governments around the world".
- 4 November: the Senate of the French Republic passed a bill requiring solar panels to be installed over outdoor parking lots having more than 80 places, with a 2026 deadline for larger lots and 2028 for others.
- 6–20 November: The 2022 United Nations Climate Change Conference (COP27, in Sharm El Sheikh, Egypt) arrived at a "loss and damage" fund for countries most affected by climate change, a development that the BBC said was hailed as a "historic moment". However, the conference failed to commit to "phasing out" fossil fuels (referring instead to "low emission and renewable energy"), and, according to the BBC, "faltered" on the 1.5 °C goal of the Paris Agreement. A large presence of representatives from fossil fuel companies influenced the conference.
- 19 December: 190 countries (excluding the U.S. and Vatican) approved a United Nations Convention on Biological Diversity agreement to protect 30 percent of the planet's land and oceans by 2030, compared to 2022's protection of ~17 percent of land and ~8 percent of oceans. The 2022 pact includes provisions to make targets measurable and to monitor countries' progress.
- December: sixteen communities in Puerto Rico (U.S.) filed a first of its kind lawsuit against oil and coal companies under the 1970 Racketeer Influenced and Corrupt Organizations (RICO) Act—originally intended to combat criminal enterprises like the mafia—alleging the companies conspired to deceive the public about the climate crisis.
- 2022: climate change protesters turned increasingly to disruptive tactics, risking arrest and widespread disapproval (e.g., glueing themselves to airport runways or museum artworks, throwing a can of soup at the glass protecting Vincent van Gogh's "Sunflowers" painting).
- 24 August: the International Monetary Fund reported that global fossil fuel subsidies in 2022 were $7 trillion ($13 million per minute), amounting to 7.1% of GDP.

=== Mitigation goal statements ===
- 29 June: Environment ministers for European Union countries reached an agreement to eliminate carbon emissions from new cars by 2035, defining the states' stance for talks with the EU Parliament and European Commission on the Fit for 55 package.
- 11 October: stating that the energy sector accounts for almost three quarters of greenhouse gas emissions, the World Meteorological Organization quoted the International Energy Agency as stating that energy supply from low-emissions sources must double by 2030 to achieve net zero by 2050.

=== Adaptation goal statements ===
- February: The U.S. Army's Climate Strategy includes providing 100% carbon-pollution-free electricity for Army installations' needs by 2030, achieving 50% reduction from 2005 levels in GHG emissions from all Army buildings by 2032, attaining net-zero GHG emissions from Army installations by 2045, fielding an all-electric light-duty non-tactical vehicle fleet by 2027, fielding purpose-built hybrid-drive tactical vehicles by 2035 and fully electric tactical vehicles by 2050, achieving carbon-pollution free contingency basing by 2050, and attaining net-zero GHG emissions from all Army procurements by 2050.
- 1 November: a key finding of the United Nations Environment Programme's Adaptation Gap Report 2022 is that "evidence suggests that for developing countries, estimated adaptation costs–and likely adaptation financing needs–could be five to ten times greater than current international adaptation finance flows".

== Public opinion and scientific consensus ==
A 2022 study found that the public substantially underestimates the degree of scientific consensus that humans are causing climate change. Studies from 2019–2021 found scientific consensus to range from 98.7–100%.

Research found that 80–90% of Americans underestimate the prevalence of support for major climate change mitigation policies and climate concern. While 66–80% Americans support these policies, Americans estimate the prevalence to be 37–43%. Researchers have called this misperception a false social reality, a form of pluralistic ignorance.

National political divides on the seriousness of climate change consistently correlate with political ideology, with right-wing opinion being more negative.

- 12 January: a survey conducted by the Yale Program on Climate Change Communication and the George Mason University Center for Climate Change Communication indicated that Americans are "alarmed" (33%), "concerned" (25%), "cautious" (17%), "disengaged" (5%), "doubtful" (10%), and "dismissive" (9%) about climate change.
- 25 July: in IEEE Access researchers review the scientific literature on 100% renewable energy, addressing various issues, outlining open research questions, and concluding there to be growing consensus, research and empirical evidence concerning its feasibility worldwide.
- 29 September: A study published in Nature Sustainability estimates the disproportionality of drivers of climate change by wealth and concludes that to total emissions, investments of the global top 1% are far more important than their consumption and that the pollution gap is larger within countries than between countries.

== Projections ==
The amount by which greenhouse gas emissions are reduced is forecast to substantially affect the number of Winter Olympic Game venues that will have reliably cold conditions.

- January: the World Economic Forum's Global Risks Perception Survey 2021–2022 listed climate inaction failure, extreme weather, and biodiversity loss as the most severe risks on a global scale over the next 10 years.
- January: Deloitte published a report forecasting that failing to take sufficient action on climate change could result in economic losses to the US economy of $14.5 trillion^{(in present-value terms)} over the next 50 years, and that decarbonization could catalyze transformational growth in the US economy that could result in $3 trillion added to the economy over that time period.
- 1 February: a study published in PLOS Climate projected a decline in global thermal refugia for coral reefs from 84% (2022) to 0.2% (at 1.5 °C of global warming), and 0% (at 2.0 °C of global warming), stating that management efforts on thermal refugia may only be effective in the short term.
- 15 February: NOAA's Global and Regional Sea Level Rise Scenarios said that relative sea level along the contiguous U.S. coastline is expected to rise on average as much over the next 30 years—25 to 30 centimetres (9.8 to 11.8 in)—as it has over the preceding 100 years.
- 23 February: the United Nations Environment Programme projected that climate change and land-use change will make wildfires more frequent and intense, with a global increase of extreme fires of up to 14% by 2030, 30% by 2050, and 50% by 2100.
- March: a study published in Urban Climate projected that the air temperature in Singapore would increase to 2.2-3.8 °C in the 2080s using global modelling results that was accommodated to city scale and taking into account the future urbanization projects.
- 30 March: an American Lung Association report stated that a national shift to 100 percent sales of zero-emission passenger vehicles (by 2035) and medium- and heavy-duty trucks (by 2040), coupled with renewable electricity, would generate over $1.2 trillion in public health benefits and avoid up to 110,000 premature deaths.
- 28 April: a study published in Science cited ocean warming and oxygen depletion, and concluded that "under business-as-usual global temperature increases, marine systems are likely to experience mass extinctions on par with past great extinctions based on ecophysiological limits alone", with polar species at highest risk.
- 9 May: a World Meteorological Organization update stated that there is a 50:50 chance of the annual average global temperature temporarily reaching 1.5 °C above pre-industrial level for at least one of the ensuing five years; in 2015 that probability was estimated as "close to zero".
- 16 May: a study published in GeoHealth concluded that eliminating energy-related fossil fuel emissions in the United States would prevent 46,900–59,400 premature deaths each year and provide $537–$678 billion in benefits from avoided PM2.5-related illness and death.
- 20 May: a study published in One Earth concluded that rising temperatures will continue to shorten sleep, primarily through delayed onset, increasing the probability of insufficient sleep and impacting human functioning, productivity, and health. Those living in warmer climates were found to lose more sleep per degree of temperature rise, and elderly, women, with residents of lower-income countries being most impacted.
- 12 August: a study published in Science Advances stated that climate-caused changes in atmospheric rivers affecting California has already doubled the likelihood of megafloods—which can involve 100 inches (250 cm) of rain and/or melted snow in the mountains per month, or 25 to 34 feet (7.6 to 10.4 m) of snow in the Sierra Nevada—and runoff in a future extreme storm scenario is predicted to be 200 to 400% greater than historical values in the Sierra Nevada.
- 25 August: a study published in Communications Earth & Environment projected that, even if global warming is constrained to within 2.0 °C, by 2100 the "extremely dangerous" (Note: Per Vargas Zeppetello et al.: A heat index above 124°F is classified as "extremely dangerous" and can lead to heat stroke, a condition with a high mortality-case ratio that can lead to death within a matter of hours.) heat index threshold 124 °F (51 °C) is likely to be exceeded on more than 15 days each year in sub-Saharan Africa, parts of the Arabian peninsula, and much of the Indian subcontinent. Exposure to "dangerous" (exceeding 103 °F (39 °C)) heat index levels are projected to likely increase by 50–100% across much of the tropics and increase by a factor of 3–10 in many regions throughout the midlatitudes.
- 29 August: a study published in Nature Climate Change projected, based on 2000–2019 climatology, that 3.3% of the Greenland ice sheet will melt, resulting in 274 millimetres (10.8 in) of global sea level rise—with "most" of the rise within the 21st century—regardless of how well greenhouse gas release is limited.
- 9 September: A study published in Science describes how multiple tipping elements in the climate system could be triggered if global warming exceeds 1.5 °C.
- 26 October: the United Nations' synthesis report of nationally determined contributions estimated that the best estimate of peak temperature in the twenty-first century is 2.1–2.9 °C. Assuming full implementation of NDCs, including all conditional elements, the best estimate for peak global mean temperature is 2.1–2.4 °C.
- 27 October: the United Nations Environment Programme's Emissions Gap Report 2022 projected that "policies currently in place with no additional action are projected to result in global warming of 2.8 °C over the twenty-first century. Implementation of unconditional and conditional NDC scenarios reduce this to 2.6 °C and 2.4 °C respectively".
- 7 November: Scientists warned in Ecological Monographs about summarized effects of climate change on insects, among other novel stressors, which may "drastically reduce our ability to build a sustainable future based on healthy, functional ecosystems", providing several recommended mitigation options.
- 2 December: the International Energy Agency projected that, in large part because of the 2022 global energy crisis, renewable energy will surpass prior predictions, and will become the largest source of global electricity generation by early 2025, surpassing coal.

== Significant publications ==
- IPCC Sixth Assessment Report, Working Group II:

- Working Group II (27 February 2022). "Climate Change 2022 / Impacts, Adaptation and Vulnerability / Summary for Policymakers" (PDF). IPCC.ch. Intergovernmental Panel on Climate change. Archived (PDF) from the original on 28 February 2022. (36 pages; 10 MB)
- Working Group II (27 February 2022). "Technical Summary" (PDF). IPCC.ch. Intergovernmental Panel on Climate Change. Archived (PDF) from the original on 28 February 2022. "Accepted, subject to final edits" (96 pages; 20 MB)
- Working Group II (27 February 2022). "Climate Change 2022 / Impacts, Adaptation and Vulnerability (full report)" (PDF). IPCC.ch. Intergovernmental Panel on Climate Change. Archived (PDF) from the original on 28 February 2022. (3675 pages; 280 MB)

- IPCC Sixth Assessment Report, Working Group III:

- Working Group III (4 April 2022). "Climate Change 2022 / Mitigation of Climate Change / Summary for Policymakers" (PDF). IPCC.ch. Intergovernmental Panel on Climate Change. Archived (PDF) from the original on 4 April 2022. (64 pages; 5 MB)
- Working Group III (4 April 2022). "WG III contribution to the Sixth Assessment Report / Technical Summary" (PDF). IPCC.ch. Intergovernmental Panel on Climate Change. Archived (PDF) from the original on 4 April 2022. (145 pages; 10 MB)
- Working Group III (4 April 2022). "Climate Change 2022 / Mitigation of Climate Change / Full Report" (PDF). IPCC.ch. Intergovernmental Panel on Climate Change. Archived (PDF) from the original on 4 April 2022. (2913 pages; 88 MB)

- "State of the Global Climate 2021". WMO.int. World Meteorological Organization (WMO-No. 1290). 18 May 2022. Archived from the original on 18 May 2022.
- "Global Electricity Review 2022" (PDF). Ember. March 2022. Archived (PDF) from the original on 30 March 2022.
- "Nationally determined contributions under the Paris Agreement / Synthesis report by the secretariat" (PDF). UNFCCC.int. United Nations Framework Convention on Climate Change. 26 October 2022. p. 30. Archived (PDF) from the original on 26 October 2022.
- "Emissions Gap Report 2022 / The Closing Window". United Nations Environment Programme. 27 October 2022. Archived from the original on 27 October 2022. (includes download link)
- "World Energy Outlook 2022" (PDF). IEA.org. International Energy Agency. 27 October 2022. Archived (PDF) from the original on 27 October 2022.
- "Adaptation Gap Report 2022 / Too Little, Too Slow / Climate Adaptation Failure Puts World at Risk". UNEP.org. United Nations Environment Programme. 1 November 2022. p. 18. Archived from the original on 1 November 2022.
- "WMO Provisional State of the Global Climate 2022". WMO.int. World Meteorological Organization. 6 November 2022. Archived from the original on 6 November 2022.
- Friedlingstein, Pierre; O'Sullivan, Michael; Jones, Matthew W.; Andrew, Robbie M.; et al. (11 November 2022). "Global Carbon Budget 2022 / Data Description Paper". Earth System Science Data. 14 (11): 4811–4900. Bibcode:2022ESSD...14.4811F. doi:10.5194/essd-14-4811-2022. hdl:20.500.11850/594889.
- "Arctic Report Card 2022 / The warming Arctic reveals shifting seasons, widespread disturbances, and the value of diverse observations" (PDF). NOAA.gov. Arctic Program, National Oceanic and Atmospheric Administration. 13 December 2022. Archived (PDF) from the original on 13 December 2022.
- 21 April 2023: "State of the Global Climate 2022". WMO.int. World Meteorological Organization (WMO). 21 April 2023. Archived from the original on 21 April 2023.

== See also ==
- 2022 in the environment
- 2022 in environmental sciences
- 2022 in science
- Climatology § History
- History of climate change policy and politics
- History of climate change science
- Politics of climate change § History
- Timeline of sustainable energy research 2020–present
