= Energy and Climate Intelligence Unit =

- Founded: 27 January 2014
- Headquarters: London, United Kingdom
- Website: eciu.net

The Energy and Climate Intelligence Unit (ECIU) is a non-profit organisation based in the UK conducting independent research and analysis on energy and climate issues. The organisation was incorporated in 2014. According to its website, the unit is "a non-profit organisation that supports informed debate on energy and climate change issues in the UK", supporting journalists, parliamentarians and other communicators with accurate briefings on key issues, and work with individuals and organisations that have interesting stories to tell, helping them connect to the national conversation.

The ECIU has been referenced by British and global press when citing data about climate change.

The organisation was founded by former BBC environment correspondent Richard Black. ECIU's Advisory Board includes climate scientists, energy policy experts, economists, MPs and peers.

The unit is solely funded by philanthropic foundations; they acknowledge support from the European Climate Foundation and other grant funding organisations.

== Notable research ==
ECIU created a series of studies to estimate how much of the global economy is committed to net zero. The research reported that 16% of the global economy was committed to such an outcome in June 2019. In February 2020 the organization estimated that 49% of the global GDP was committed to a net zero target. In May 2020, ECIU estimated that 53% of global GDP is committed to a net zero target for 2050, while an estimate in 2021 referred to "around two thirds of the global economy" operating under a net zero pledge, although the unit warned that such commitments "vary hugely in quality".
