= 2021 in the environment =

This is an article of notable issues relating to the terrestrial environment of Earth in 2021. They relate to environmental events such as natural disasters, environmental sciences such as ecology and geoscience with a known relevance to contemporary influence of humanity on Earth, environmental law, conservation, environmentalism with major worldwide impact and environmental issues.

== Events ==
Date / period	Type of event	Event	Topics	Image
January 11	Coordination, Policy	The One Planet Summit is held as a virtual event. Results: 50 nations of the "High Ambition Coalition" agree to aim to protect 30 % of their terrestrial and marine areas, financing of the Great Green Wall in Africa is agreed to.		
February 1	Policy	The Chinese national carbon trading scheme is launched The nationwide carbon trading market is set to launch by June.		

=== Environmental policies approved ===
- 5 February – Australia's Northern Territory bans seabed mining in its coastal waters.

=== Environmental sciences ===
Date / period	Type	Description	Topics	Image
January 6	Review	In the first scientific systematic review of the scientific evidence around global waste, its management and impact on human health and life, authors provide assessments, suggestions for corrective action, engineering solutions and requests for further research. They find that about half of all the municipal solid terrestrial waste – or close to one billion tons per year – is either not collected or mismanaged after collection, often being burned in open and uncontrolled fires. Authors conclude that "massive risk mitigation can be delivered" while noting that broad priority areas each lack a "high-quality research base", partly due to the absence of "substantial research funding", which scientists often require.	[waste]	
January 13	Statistics / records	A new record high temperature of the world's oceans is reported, measured from the surface level down to a depth of 2,000 metres.	[temperature record]	
January 13	Review, Analysis, Assessment	A group of 17 high-ranking ecologists publish a perspective piece that reviews a number of studies that, based on current trends, indicate that future environmental conditions will be far more dangerous than currently believed, concluding that current challenges – themselves in specific – that humanity faces are large and underestimated. The small group cautions that such an "optimism bias" is prevalent and that fundamental changes are required, listing a few of such they consider adequate in the form of broad descriptions in their largely static document, published by a scientific journal.	[policy]	
January 22	Review	A study described as the "first long-term assessment of global bee decline", which analyzed GBIF-data of over a century, finds that the number of bee species declined steeply after the 1990s, shrinking by a quarter in 2006–2015 compared to before 1990.	[insect decline]	
January 25	Review	Global ice loss is found to be accelerating at a record rate in a scientific review, matching the worst-case scenarios of the IPCC.	[global warming] [sea level rise]	
January 27	Observation, Analysis	Scientists report that shark and ray populations have fallen by 71% since 1970 as a result of human actions, primarily overfishing.	[animals]	
February 9	Attribution, Modelling	A study using a high spatial resolution model and an updated concentration-response function finds that 10.2 million global excess deaths in 2012 and 8.7 M in 2018 – or a fifth – were due to air pollution generated by fossil fuel combustion, significantly higher than earlier estimates and with spatially subdivided mortality impacts.	[air pollution] [transportation]	
February 9	Analysis, Predictions	A study concludes that the rates of emissions reductions need to increase by 80% beyond NDCs to meet the 2 °C upper target range of the Paris Agreement, that the probabilities of major emitters meeting their NDCs without such an increase is very low, estimating that with current trends the probability of staying below 2 °C of warming is 5% and if NDCs were met and continued post-2030 by all signatory systems 26%.	[global warming] [policy]	
February 9	Development, Analysis	A study finds that air pollution by nitrogen dioxide could be a technosignature by which one could detect extraterrestrial civilizations via "atmospheric SETI".	[air pollution]	
February 15	Observation	Researchers report, for the first time, the detection of lifeforms 872 m below the ice of Antarctica, at a depth of 1,233 m and 260 km from the open water at the Filchner-Ronne Ice Shelf's calving margin.	[animals]	
February 16	Analysis, Observation	Global warming is found to cause increases of pollen season lengths and concentrations.	[global warming]	
February 25	Analysis, Observation, Projections	Researchers confirm that the Atlantic meridional overturning circulation, which includes the Gulf Stream, is at its weakest since about 1,000 years ago, experiencing unprecedented weakening – likely due to global warming – which could result in more extreme weather events – including heatwaves and intense winters – and is moving towards a "tipping point".	[]	
March 8	Assessment, Attribution, Projections	Study results indicate that limiting global warming to 1.5 °C would prevent most of the tropics from reaching the wet-bulb temperature of the human physiological limit, beyond which they are fatal after a few hours without artificial cooling.	[global warming]	
March 8	Attribution	A new global food emissions database indicates that the current food systems are responsible for one third (34%) of the global anthropogenic greenhouse gas emissions.	[Food system]	
March 12	Review	Results of a scientific synthesis indicate that, in terms of global warming, the Amazon basin with the Amazon rainforest now emits more greenhouse gases than it absorbs overall due to climate change impacts and human activities in the area – mainly deforestation.	[deforestation] [forests]	
March 17	Assessment, Development	A study finds that an optimized globally coordinated marine conservation could be "nearly twice as efficient as uncoordinated, national-level" planning and estimates that bottom trawling releases as much CO_{2}-emissions as pre-COVID-19 aviation.	[ocean] [policy]	
March 18	Attribution	An accepted preprint finds that the severity of heatwave and drought impacts on crop production roughly tripled over the last 50 years in Europe.	[extreme weather]	
March 29	Attribution, Analysis	In a static proprietary article that appeared in and was reviewed by a scientific journal, authenticated scientists analyze data from multiple public databases to create a regional representation of levels of deforestation induced by nations' recent, largely unmodulated, trade-, production- and consumption-patterns, showing e.g. that the G7 are driving an average annual loss of 3.9 trees per capita and that India and China increased the deforestation embodied in their imports.	[deforestation]	
March 29	Observation	A case-control study of cities finds that redistributing street space for cycling infrastructure – for so-called "pop-up bike lanes" – during the COVID-19 pandemic lead to large additional increases in cycling.	[global warming] [policy]	
March 29	Analysis	The extensive pesticide pollution risks worldwide are estimated with a new environmental model.	[insects] [pesticides]	
April 6	Observation, Projections, Analysis	A study finds that carbon emissions from Bitcoin mining in China – where a majority of the proof-of-work algorithm that generates current economic value is computed, largely fueled by nonrenewable sources – have accelerated rapidly, would soon exceed total annual emissions of countries like Italy and Spain in 2016 and interfere with climate change mitigation commitments.	[global warming]	
April 7	Statistics / records	The NOAA reports the largest annual increase in methane emissions since records began, with a rise of 14.7 parts per billion (ppb) in 2020.	[Methane emissions]	
April 12	Meta	The magazine Scientific American announces that it will stop using the term "climate change" in articles about human-caused global warming and substitute "climate emergency" instead.	[declarations]	
April 12	Development	News outlets report that the first prototype 3D printed house made out of clay, Tecla, has been completed. The low-carbon housing was printed by two large arms from a mix of mainly locally sourced soil and water. Such buildings could be highly cheap, well-insulated, stable, get produced rapidly, require only very little easily learnable manual labor, mitigate carbon emissions from concrete, require less energy, reduce homelessness, help enable intentional communities, and enable the provision of housing for victims of natural disasters as well as for migrants to Europe near their homes, rather than political facilitation of their influx.	[global warming] [housing]	
April 12	Development	Scientists develop a prototype and design rules for both-sides-contacted silicon solar cells with conversion efficiencies of 26% and above, Earth's highest for this type of solar cell.	[solar power]	
April 15	Development	Researchers demonstrate the whitest ever paint formulation, which reflects up to 98.1% of sunlight and could be used in place of air conditioners.	[global warming]	
April 16	Observation, Analysis	Scientists report that in the case of Alaskan forests, such boreal forests recovered from wildfires by shifting to a deciduous-coniferous mix, which could offset the carbon emitted during the fires.	[forests] [wildfires] [global warming]	
April 23	Assessment	Scientists report that of ~39 million groundwater wells 6-20% are at high risk of running dry, particularly that this would likely occur if local groundwater levels decline by less than 5 meters, or – as with many areas and possibly more than half of major aquifers – if they continue to decline.	[water resources]	
May 4	Analysis, Assessment	A study assesses benefits of fast action to reduce methane emissions when compared to slower climate change mitigation of this form. On 6 May a U.N. report assesses benefits and costs of rapidly mitigating methane emissions.	[methane emissions]	
October 1	Analysis, Attribution	Researchers find that China's CO_{2} emissions surpassed that of all OECD countries combined for the first time in 2019. On 20 May China's CO_{2} emissions are found to be 9 % higher than pre-COVID-19-pandemic levels in 2021-Q1 with CO_{2} emissions from fossil fuels and cement production having grown by 14.5% compared to 2020.	[global warming] [policy]	
May 7	Development	Researchers address a key problem of perovskite solar cells by increasing their stability and long-term reliability with a form of "molecular glue".	[solar power]	
May 11	Analysis	Scientists estimate, with higher resolution data, that land-use change has affected 17 % of land in 1960–2019, or when considering multiple change events "around four times" previous estimates and investigate its drivers, identifying global trade affecting agriculture as a main driver.	[land-use change] [food system]	
May 11	Analysis, Assessment, Projections	Scientists report that degrowth scenarios, where economic output either "declines" or declines in terms of contemporary economic metrics such as current GDP, have been neglected in considerations of 1.5 °C scenarios reported by the IPCC, finding that investigated degrowth scenarios "minimize many key risks for feasibility and sustainability compared to technology-driven pathways" with a core problem of such being feasibility in the context of contemporary political decision-making and rebound- and relocation-effects.	[economy] [global warming] [policy]	
June 10	Development	Researchers report the development of a plant proteins-based biodegradable packaging alternative to plastic based on research about the molecularly similar spider silk which is known for its high strength.	[plastic pollution]	
June 15	Observation	Scientists report measurements of the rapidly increasing rate of the Earth's energy budget imbalance of global warming.	[global warming]	
June 15	Observation	Scientists complement extensive evidence that cosmetics are widely designed with formulations and disposals that are known to be harmful to human health and ecosystems, often containing PFAS.	[waste]	
June 29	Analysis, Assessment	A study concludes that public services are associated with higher human need satisfaction and lower energy requirements while contemporary forms of economic growth are linked with the opposite. Authors find that the contemporary economic system is structurally misaligned with goals of sustainable development and that to date no nation can provide decent living standards at sustainable levels of energy and resource use. They provide analysis about factors in social provisioning and assess that improving beneficial provisioning-factors and infrastructure would allow for sustainable forms of sufficient need satisfaction.	[economy] [energy]	
June 29	Analysis	Scientists report that solar-energy-driven production of microbial foods from direct air capture substantially outperforms agricultural cultivation of staple crops in terms of land use.	[land use] [food system]	
July 1	Analysis, Observation	A study finds that 9.4% of global deaths between 2000 and 2019 – ~5 million annually – can be attributed to extreme temperature with cold-related ones making up the larger share and decreasing and heat-related ones making up ~0.91 % and increasing.	[extreme weather]	
July 2	Review, Analysis, Assessment	The first scientific review in the professional academic literature about global plastic pollution in general finds that the rational response to the "global threat" would be "reductions in consumption of virgin plastic materials, along with internationally coordinated strategies for waste management" – such as banning export of plastic waste unless it leads to better recycling – and describes the state of knowledge about "poorly reversible" impacts.	[plastic pollution]	
July 2	Development	Researchers report that a mix of microorganisms from cow stomachs could break down three types of plastics.	[plastic pollution]	
July 14	Mechanics	Researchers describe effects of deforestation and climate change in a transformation of Amazonia from carbon sink to carbon source.	[deforestation]	
July 19	Analysis, Assessment, Projections	Researchers review 217 analyses of on-the-market products and services as well as existing alternatives to mainstream food, holidays, and furnishings, and conclude that total greenhouse gas emissions could be lowered by to date up to 36–38% if consumers – without a decrease in total estimated expenditure or considerations of self-interest rationale – instead were to obtain those they could assess to be more sustainable.	[global warming] [economy]	
July 19	Analysis, Assessment	Researchers report that higher exposure to woodland urban green spaces is associated with improved cognitive development and risks of mental problems for urban adolescents.	[cities]	
July 19	Analysis, Assessment	Scientists report that wild pigs are causing soil disturbance that, among other problems, globally results in annual carbon dioxide emissions equivalent to that of ~1.1 million passenger vehicles, implying that wild pig meat – unlike other meat products – has beneficial effects on the environment.	[soil]	
July 26	Mechanics, Projections	A study finds that the increasing probability of record week-long heat extremes occurrence depends on warming rate, rather than global warming level and provides projections.	[extreme weather]	
July 28	Review, Analysis, Assessment	In an update to the World Scientists' Warning to Humanity, scientists report that evidence of nearing or crossed tipping points of critical elements of the Earth system is accumulating, that 1990 jurisdictions have formally recognized a state of climate emergency, that frequent and accessible updates on the emergency are needed, that COVID-19 "green recovery" has been insufficient and that root-cause system changes above politics are required.	[global warming]	
August 5	Analysis, Projections	A study introduces an early-warning indicator for critical transitions of the Atlantic Meridional Overturning Circulation (AMOC) and finds early-warning signals in eight independent AMOC indices. A, possibly abrupt, likely irreversible collapse from the current strong to a weak mode is thought to have severe impacts on Earth system components and global climate. The Sixth IPCC report assesses a 'medium confidence' that such a collapse won't happen by 2100.	[climate change] [oceans]	
August 9	Review	The UN's Intergovernmental Panel on Climate Change (IPCC) releases the first part of its Sixth Assessment Report. The report which has been described as a "code red for humanity" summarizes the state of physical sciences on climate change based on over 14,000 papers.	[climate change]	
August 9	Analysis	A researcher reports that solar superstorms would cause large-scale global months-long Internet outages. She describes potential mitigation measures and exceptions – such as user-powered mesh networks, related peer-to-peer applications and new protocols – and the robustness of the current Internet infrastructure.	[solar storms]	
August 16	Assessment	Scientists conclude that personal carbon allowances (PCAs) could be a component of climate change mitigation. They find that the economic recovery from COVID-19 and novel digital technology capacities open a window of opportunity for first implementations. PCAs would consist of – e.g. monetary – credit-feedbacks and decreasing default levels of per capita emissions concessions. The researchers find that recent advances in machine learning technology and "smarter home and transport options make it possible to easily track and manage a large share of individuals' emissions" and that feedback effective in engaging individuals to reduce their energy-related emissions and relevant new personalized apps could be designed. Issues may include privacy, evaluating emissions from individuals co-running multinational companies and the availability and prices of products and services.	[climate change]	
August 16	Review	Researchers assess regionally-differentiated drivers and risks associated with worldwide pollinator decline, informing globally-relevant policy responses.	[insect decline]	
August 18	Observation, Analysis	A study suggests that the global policy Montreal Protocol intended to control the production of ozone-depleting substances has also substantially mitigated climate change.	[climate change] [policy]	
September 1	Development	Scientists report the development of a new solar-energy passive off-grid chemically stored on-demand cooling system for houses and/or refrigeration without electrical components which may be useful for climate change mitigation and adaptation.	[climate change mitigation] [climate change adaptation]	
September 2	Observation, Assessment	A study finds that outdoor air pollution is associated with substantially increased mortality "even at low pollution levels below the current European and North American standards and WHO guideline values". On 22 September, for the first time since 2005, the WHO, after a systematic review of the accumulated evidence, adjusted their air quality guidelines whose adherence could save millions of lives, protect against future diseases and help meet climate goals.	[air pollution]	
September 3	Observation, Analysis, Projections	Scientists report that the accelerated, higher-variability warming of the Arctic is causing more frequent extremely cold winter weather across parts of Asia and North America – including the February 2021 North American cold wave – via, observed and modeled, stratospheric polar vortex disruption.	[climate change] [extreme weather]	
September 8	Analysis, Assessment	Scientists provide the first scientific assessment of the minimum amount of fossil fuels that would need to be secured from extraction per region as well as globally, to allow for a 50 % probability of limiting global warming by 2050 to 1.5 °C.	[climate change] [fossil fuels]	
September 10	Review, Assessment	43 expert scientists publish the first scientific framework version that – via integration, review, clarifications and standardization – enables the evaluation of levels of protection of marine protected areas and can serve as a guide for improving, planning and monitoring marine protection-quality and -extents such as in efforts towards the 30%-protection-goal of the "Global Deal For Nature" and the UN's SDG 14.	[marine protected area]	
September 15	Mechanics, Observation	Scientists confirm that widespread phytoplankton blooms can be a feedback effect of wildfires. The climate change-exacerbated 2019–2020 Australian wildfires caused oceanic deposition of wildfire aerosols, enhancing marine productivity and thereby increasing oceanic carbon dioxide uptake. A study using satellite data complements these findings, estimating the CO_{2} emissions of the fires from November 2019 to January 2020 to be ~715 million tons.	[climate change]	
September 23	Development	Media outlets report that the world's first synthetic coffee product has been created, still awaiting regulatory approval for near-term commercialization. On 15 September production of the first batches of synthetic coffee by another biotechnology company is reported. Such products, for which multiple companies' R&D have acquired substantial funding, may have equal or highly similar effects, composition and taste as natural products but use less water, generate less carbon emissions, require less labor and cause no deforestation.	[food system]	
September 23	Development	Researchers report the world's first artificial synthesis of starch. The material essential for many products and the most common carbohydrate in human diets was made from CO_{2} in a cell-free process and could reduce land, pesticide and water use as well as greenhouse gas emissions while increasing food security.	[food system]	
September 23	Development	After commissioning two impact assessment studies and a technology analysis study, the European Commission proposes the implementation of a standardization – for iterations of USB-C – of phone charger products, which may increase device-interoperability, convergence and convenience for consumers while decreasing resource-needs, redundancy and electronic waste.	[e-waste] [material extraction]	
September 24	Projections	Researchers conclude that projecting effects – such as regional inhabitability, human migration and food insecurity – of greenhouse gas emissions only for up to 2100, as widely practiced in research and policy-making, is short-sighted and model climate change scenarios for up to 2500.	[climate change]	
September 26	Projections	Researchers estimate that children born in 2020 (e.g. "Generation Alpha") will experience 2–7 as many extreme weather events, particularly heat waves, compared to people born in 1960 (e.g. "Baby Boomers" and "Generation X") under current climate policy pledges over their lifetimes, raising issues of intergenerational equity.	[climate change] [extreme weather]	
September 27	Development	Landsat 9, described as the world's most important satellite, is launched by NASA to study the Earth and its environment.	[monitoring]	
October 5	Award	The 2021 Nobel Prize in Physics is awarded to Syukuro Manabe and Klaus Hasselmann (1/2) "for the physical modelling of Earth's climate, quantifying variability and reliably predicting global warming" and Giorgio Parisi (1/2) "for the discovery of the interplay of disorder and fluctuations in physical systems from atomic to planetary scales" – all of which "for groundbreaking contributions to our understanding of complex systems".	[climate change]	
October 11	Projections	Scientists project public health impacts, along with some of the environmental damage, of a simulated imminent Red Sea oil spill from the FSO Safer.	[ocean pollution]	
October 12	Observation	Scientists report that for 13,115 cities extreme heat exposure of a wet bulb globe temperature above 30 °C tripled between 1983 and 2016. It increased by ~50% when the population growth in these cities is not taken into account. Urban areas are often significantly warmer than surrounding rural areas.	[climate change]	
October 16	Analysis, Assessment	A comprehensive study by Scientists for Future concludes that nuclear fission energy cannot meaningfully contribute to climate change mitigation as it is "too dangerous, too expensive, and too sluggishly deployable" as well as "an obstacle to achieving the social-ecological transformation".	[climate change]	
October 27	Development	Researchers release a "policy sequencing" framework, in particular for policies of polycentric governance for completely halting and preventing deforestation based on data about already implemented government-designed policies, UN-decided REDD+ initiatives and voluntary private sector initiatives of recent deforestation interventions.	[Policy] [deforestation]	
October 28	Proposal	An open letter by almost 300 scientists asks the WTO to eliminate increasing harmful fisheries subsidies.	[Policy] [ocean]	
October 30	Review	A comprehensive review summarizes scientific research and data about health impacts of climate change.	[climate change]	
November 2	Analysis	A study concludes that PM_{2.5} air pollution induced by contemporary forms of free trade and consumption by the 19 G20 nations (the EU as a whole is not included) causes two million premature deaths annually, suggesting that the average lifetime consumption of about ~28 people in these countries causes at least one premature death (average age ~67) while developing countries "cannot be expected" to implement or be able to implement countermeasures without external support or internationally coordinated efforts.	[air pollution]	
November 19	Observation	A report by Brazil's INPE based on satellite data finds deforestation of the Amazon rainforest has increased by 22% over 2020 and is at its highest level (13,235 km²) since 2006.	[deforestation]	
November 25	Analysis, Assessment	Researchers systematically assess impacts of climate change mitigation options on 18 constituents of well-being, finding largely beneficial effects of demand-side solutions based on inputs from 604 studies.	[policy] [climate change]	
December 16	Observation, Proposal	Researchers propose buffer-zones around nature reserves where pesticide-use is drastically reduced, based on Germany-wide field study data which i.a. found insect samples in such areas to be contaminated with ~16 pesticides on average.	[policy] [pesticides]	

==== Geosciences, biotechnology, anthropology and geoengineering ====
Date / period	Type	Description	Topics	Image
January 13		Scientists report that all glacial periods of ice ages over the last 1.5 M years were associated with northward shifts of melting Antarctic icebergs which changed ocean circulation patterns, leading to more CO_{2} being pulled out of the atmosphere. Authors note that this process may be disrupted as the Southern Ocean may be too warm for the icebergs to travel far enough to trigger these changes or effects.	[climate change]	
February 19		Scientists report that the short global geomagnetic reversal – a geomagnetic excursion – of Earth's magnetic field ~42,000 years ago – the Laschamp event – in combination with grand solar minima, caused major extinctions and environmental changes and may have contributed to the extinction of the Neanderthals and appearances of cave art. It altered the geographical extension of auroras and levels of harmful radiation worldwide. They term the event which they find to constitute a major enviro-archaeological boundary "Adams Transitional Geomagnetic Event".	[geomagnetic reversal]	
March 30		Scientists report evidence of subglacial sediment stored since 1966 that indicates that Greenland was ice-free and vegetated at least once within the last million years.		
April 2		Scientists report that the event that caused the mass-extinction of dinosaurs gave rise to neotropical rainforest biomes like the Amazonia, replacing species composition and structure of local forests. During ~6 million years of recovery to former levels of plant diversity, they evolved from widely spaced gymnosperm-dominated forests to the forests with thick canopies which block sunlight, prevalent flowering plants and high vertical layering as known today.		
October 1	Observation, development	Researchers demonstrate that probiotics can help coral reefs mitigate heat stress, indicating that such could make them more resilient to climate change and mitigate coral bleaching.	[oceans] [climate change]	
August 31	Observation	Scientists report that the Paleocene–Eocene Thermal Maximum was directly preceded by volcanism and that data about the event supports the existence of substantial climate-shifting tipping points in the Earth system.	[climate change]	
September 8	Observation	Scientists report that Earth is reflecting less light – a dimming of ~0.5% in reflectance over two decades may have both been co-caused by climate change as well as substantially increase global warming.		
September 17	Observation	Scientists report that harmful algal blooms, which have been linked to deforestation, global warming and soil erosion, are proliferating in lakes and rivers around the globe. They add that such toxic algal blooms were a prominent feature of previous mass extinction events, in particular of the End-Permian Extinction.	[climate change]	

== Other events ==
- 1–12 November – 2021 United Nations Climate Change Conference
- Stop Saving the Planet!: An Environmentalist Manifesto was published by Jenny Price, which centered on how the environmental movement has resulted in greenwashing.

== International goals ==
A list of − mostly self-imposed and legally voluntary or unenforceable − goals related to the environment and/or environmental sciences due by or established in 2021 as decided by multinational corporate associations or international governance entities and their status:

Entity	Agreement	Goal	Status
European Union	Plan S	Plan S is an initiative for open-access science publishing launched in 2018 by "cOAlition S", a consortium of national research agencies and funders from twelve European countries. The plan requires scientists and researchers who benefit from state-funded research organisations and institutions to publish their work in open repositories or in journals that are available to all by 2021. The "S" stands for "shock".	
(United Nations) Paris Agreement	Paris Agreement		

Result reports

Entity	Agreement	Goal	Status
United NationsConvention on Biological Diversity	Aichi Target 11, 2010 (1)	Protecting 17% of Earth's land by 2020	Yes (16.64 % officially reported, assessed as likely exceeding 17 %)
United NationsConvention on Biological Diversity	Aichi Target 11, 2010 (2)	Protecting 10% of Earth's marine environments by 2020	No (7.74 %)

A session of the United Nations General Assembly decided that the theme and Sustainable Development Goals discussed at the 2021 High-level Political Forum will be "Sustainable and resilient recovery from the COVID-19 pandemic that promotes the economic, social and environmental dimensions of sustainable development: building an inclusive and effective path for the achievement of the 2030 Agenda in the context of the decade of action and delivery for sustainable development".

=== Goal-oriented coordination ===
==== Governmental budgets ====
- 22 April – Brazil's political leader, Jair Bolsonaro, or his leadership apparatus decides to cut the government's annual environmental budget by 23 % compared to the previous year, making it the lowest in the history of the nation since the 1990s and reducing means to protect the Amazon rainforest.
- 3 May – It is announced that Germany will spend an additional 5 billion euros to reduce emissions from the steel industry and will finance steelmakers' hydrogen production projects.

== See also ==
=== General ===
- 2020s in environmental history
- 2021 in climate change
- Green recovery
- 2021 in space
- List of environmental issues
- List of years in the environment
- Outline of environmental studies

=== Natural environment ===
- List of large volcanic eruptions in the 21st century
- Lists of extinct animals#Recent extinction
- Category:Species described in 2021
- Category:Protected areas established in 2021

=== Artificial development ===
- Timeline of sustainable energy research 2020–present
- 2021 in rail transport
- Human impact on the environment
