= The Year Earth Changed =

- Directed by: Tom Beard
- Produced by: Mike Gunton; Alice Keens-Soper
- Narrated by: David Attenborough
- Music by: Adam Skinner; Dan Skinner
- Production company: BBC Natural History Unit
- Distributed by: Apple TV+
- Release date: April 16, 2021
- Running time: 48 minutes
- Country: United States
- Language: English

The Year Earth Changed is a 2021 British nature documentary film about the COVID-19 pandemic and its impact on nature directed by Tom Beard. It focuses on wildlife during public health lockdowns and travel restrictions from the onset of the pandemic in 2020. The film was produced by the BBC Natural History Unit as a collaboration between Mike Gunton and Alice Keens-Soper. The documentary was narrated by David Attenborough.

Apple TV+ released the documentary on April 16, 2021.

== Synopsis ==
The first part of the documentary focuses on the impacts of reduced pollution due to the lockdown. In San Francisco, in the shadow of the Golden Gate Bridge, white-crowned sparrows changed their song in response to reduced noise pollution. Reduced air pollution was also observed across the world, including in Jalandhar, India, where the Himalayas were visible for the first time in a lifetime. The film then transitions to the impacts of the abrupt halt in tourism. Florida's beaches were deserted, allowing loggerhead turtles to have a record breeding season. In Alaska, due to a lack of cruise ships, humpback whales were able to hear each other's calls much more easily, and mothers were able to leave their calves alone while going out to hunt. The drop in global shipping traffic also positively affected the communication of other cetaceans, such as common dolphins in New Zealand's Hauraki Gulf, and orcas in Canada's Salish Sea. Next, the film looks at the sudden lack of human activity in many areas, leading to animals visiting cities around the world, including a hippopotamus in St Lucia, South Africa, golden jackals in Tel Aviv, a puma in Santiago, and capybaras in Buenos Aires. In Nara, Japan, the local population of sika deer, usually dependent on handouts from humans, rediscovered their old grazing sites. Many animals visit a safari lodge in Mpumalanga, including vervet monkeys, impala, nyala and even a male leopard, and this usually nocturnal animal started hunting during the day in the grounds of the lodge. Water cleanliness increased across the world. In Cape Town, African penguins usually come back to shore at night after finding food to avoid humans, but in having the beach to themselves, they were able to come back at any time during the day, and then head out again, leading to their chicks being fed much more often and many more chicks being raised. In Kenya's Maasai Mara, cheetah mothers were able to communicate better with their cubs due to the lack of safari vehicles. Other species also benefited from reduced human activity due to lockdown, including mountain gorillas in Uganda, and spiny seahorses in Dorset. In Kenya, no rhinoceros were poached for their horns for the first time in over 20 years. Global carbon emissions were significantly reduced, and the reduction of human activity on the earth's surface led to one of the quietest periods underground ever observed. The film ends with a plea to use these observations to find ways to better coexist with nature. This is communicated with an example of a village in Assam, where, to reduce the raiding of farms and villages by Asian elephants, and so reduce human-elephant conflict, people working from home due to lockdown were able to create a plantation of wild rice specifically for elephants, and this project has been a great success.

== Reception ==
Review aggregator website Rotten Tomatoes reported an approval rating of 100% based on 11 reviews, with an average rating of 7.9/10.

== See also ==
- Impact of the COVID-19 pandemic on the environment
