= Green recovery =

Type of economic stimulus program

Green recovery packages are proposed environmental, regulatory, and fiscal reforms to rebuild prosperity in the wake of an economic crisis, such as the COVID-19 recession or the 2008 financial crisis. They pertain to fiscal measures that intend to recover economic growth while also positively benefitting the environment, including measures for renewable energy, efficient energy use, nature-based solutions, sustainable transport, green innovation and green jobs, amongst others.

Support for a green recovery in response to the COVID-19 pandemic has come from multiple political parties, governments, activists, and academia across the globe. Following similar measures in response to the GFC, a key goal of the packages is to ensure that actions to combat recession also combat climate change. These actions include the reduction of coal, oil, and gas use, clean transport, renewable energy, eco-friendly buildings, and sustainable corporate or financial practices. Green recovery initiatives are supported by the United Nations (UN) and the Organisation for Economic Co-operation and Development (OECD). Several global initiatives have provided live tracking of national fiscal responses, including the Global Recovery Observatory (from Oxford University, the UN, and the International Monetary Fund (IMF)), the Energy Policy Tracker, and the OECD's Green Recovery Tracker.

Delineating between rescue and recovery investment, in March 2021 analysis by the Global Recovery Observatory found that 18% of recovery investment and 2.5% of total spending was expected to enhance sustainability. In July 2021, the International Energy Agency supported that analysis, noting that only around 2% of economic bailout money worldwide was going to clean energy. According to a 2022 analysis of the $14tn that G20 countries spent as economic stimulus, only about 6% of pandemic recovery spending was allocated to areas that will also cut greenhouse-gas emissions, including electrifying vehicles, making buildings more energy efficient and installing renewables.

== Background ==
Since the industrial revolution, the burning of coal, oil, and gas has released millions of tons of carbon dioxide, methane, and other greenhouse gases into the atmosphere, causing anthropogenic climate change. By 2020, the Earth's average temperature was 1 °C higher than pre-industrial levels. The UN Intergovernmental Panel on Climate Change (IPCC) calculated in its 2014 Synthesis Report that relative to the period of 1850–1900, the end of the 21st century (2081–2100) could see global mean surface temperature increase of 1.5-2.5 °C. Burning a fraction of fossil fuel reserves will therefore lead to dangerous planetary heating, resulting in widespread crop failures, and the 6th mass extinction event.

By the end of 2019, increasing incidents of wild fires in Australia, the Amazon rainforest in Brazil, and the Arctic forests in Russia had been reported, as well as increased risks of hurricanes in the United States and Caribbean, and flooding. In 2015, most countries signed the Paris Agreement committing to limit global carbon emissions to prevent temperature rises by over 2 °C, with an ambition to limit temperature rise to 1.5 °C. Activists and politicians, particularly younger people, demanded a "Green New Deal" in the US, a Green Industrial Revolution in the UK, and to end the use of fossil fuels in transport, energy generation, agriculture, buildings, and finance. In late 2019, the EU announced a European Green Deal, although this was said to fall far short of the goal of ending fossil fuel use in the bloc by 2050.

In early 2020, the COVID-19 pandemic caused countries to lock down their economies, in an attempt to prevent infections and deaths. This required many businesses to suspend work, as people travelled less, shopped less, and stayed at home to work more. In most countries, this caused job losses. The fall in economic activity also caused a fall in greenhouse gas emissions. This drove groups to call for, and politicians and governments to promise, a green recovery.

In earlier discourses, the positive side effects of green policies have been termed co-benefits. According to the IPCC, co-benefits are "the positive effects that a policy or measure aimed at one objective might have on other objectives, without yet evaluating the net effect on overall social welfare". Renewable energies can boost employment and industrial development. Depending on the country and the deployment scenario, replacing coal power plants with renewable energy can more than double the number of jobs per average MW capacity (albeit, this represents a concomitant 50% productivity loss). Besides economic effects, climate mitigation strategies can provide health-related co-benefits. Solar mini-grids can improve electricity access for rural areas and the replacement of coal-based energy with renewables can lower the number of premature deaths caused by air pollution.

== Proposals ==
Proposals for a green recovery vary widely.

=== United States ===
In the United States, a group of academics and activists introduced "a green stimulus to rebuild our economy" in March 2020. The policies targeted eight fields: housing and civic infrastructure, transportation, labour and green manufacturing, energy generation, food and agriculture, environment and green infrastructure, innovation policy, and foreign policy. The requested funding level was set at 4% of the US GDP, or around $850 billion a year, until the dual achievement of full decarbonisation and an unemployment rate below 3.5%.

Over the spring of 2021, US President Biden introduced his American Jobs Plan and American Families Plan, which incorporated green recovery principles including investments in carbon capture and storage, clean energy, and a Civilian Climate Corps similar to the Depression-era Civilian Conservation Corps. Progressives criticised the plans as not ambitious enough.

=== United Kingdom ===
In the UK, the government proposed "a green and resilient recovery," and announced £3 billion in funding for building renovations in July 2020. By contrast, in early July, an academic and think tank group proposed a "Green Recovery Act" that targeted nine fields: transport, energy generation, agriculture, fossil fuels, local government, international agreement, finance and corporate governance, employment, and investment. This established duties on all public bodies and regulators to end the use of fossil fuels "as fast as technologically practicable," with strict exceptions if absent technical alternatives.

=== Europe ===
In June 2020, the German government pledged a green recovery with funding of €40 billion as part of a €130 billion recovery package.

In July 2020, the European Council agreed to a recovery fund of €750 billion, branded Next Generation EU (NGEU). An overall climate target of 30% would apply to the total amount of expenditure from the NGEU in compliance with the Paris climate agreement.

=== Africa ===
A comprehensive plan has been proposed to help Africa recover from the COVID-19 crisis and address the challenges of climate change. The plan focuses on key areas such as food security, water access, and resilient infrastructure. By empowering female farmers, leveraging technology, improving water governance, and investing in sustainable infrastructure, Africa can become more resilient and prosperous. Learning from past pandemics, it is crucial to take a fresh approach and prioritize sustainable investments for a better future. Implementing these recommendations will create a stronger Africa, capable of tackling future challenges and achieving economic recovery.

=== Globally ===
In February 2021, commentators such as the Council on Foreign Relations noted that other major economies such as China, India, and the European Union had begun "implementing some of the policies envisioned by the Green New Deal."

A July 2021 update to the World Scientists' Warning to Humanity found that 17% of COVID-19 recovery investments funds that had reportedly been allocated to a green recovery as of March 2021 to be insufficient. They warned that climate policies should be part of COVID-19 recovery. They demanded that plans address root causes and that immediate, drastic reductions in greenhouse gases be prioritised.

According to a 2021 analysis by the Overseas Development Institute, China could do more to support a green recovery in developing countries.

== Economics ==
Economic growth has been a key driver of CO_{2} emissions. Economic growth may also drive technological change and increase energy efficiency. Economic growth typically requires investment. Investment in energy-intensive sectors, specifically carbon energy sources, can strengthen the link between economic growth and emissions. If the investment is in clean energy the relationship can be the reverse. Investment in less energy-related sectors, such as the services sector, then the link may be tenuous.

The "environmental Kuznets curve" (EKC) hypothesis posits that at early stages of development, pollution per capita and GDP per capita move in the same direction. Beyond a certain income level, emissions per capita decrease as GDP per capita increases, thus generating a U-shaped relationship between GDP per capita and pollution. One study concluded that the econometrics literature did not support either an optimistic or a pessimistic interpretation of the hypothesis. Instead, it suggested some degree of flexibility between economic growth and emissions growth.

=== Digital technologies ===
Digital technologies are important in achieving the green transition and the European Green Deal's environmental targets. Emerging digital technologies, if correctly applied, have the potential to play a critical role in addressing environmental issues. Smart city mobility, precision agriculture, sustainable supply chains, environmental monitoring, and catastrophe prediction are just a few examples.

Digitally advanced companies put more money into energy-saving strategies. In the EU, 59% of companies that have made investments in both basic and advanced technologies have also invested in energy efficiency measures, compared to only 50% of US firms in the same category. Overall, there is a significant disparity between businesses' digital profiles and investments in energy efficiency.

== See also ==
- Energy law
- Fossil fuel phase-out
- Phase-out of fossil fuel boilers
- Phase-out of fossil fuel vehicles
- Coal phase-out
- European Green Deal
- Green economy
- Green growth
- Green New Deal
- Impact of the COVID-19 pandemic on the environment
- Just transition
- Politics of climate change
- Timeline of sustainable energy research 2020–present
