= Pop-up bicycle lane =

Bike path established on short notice

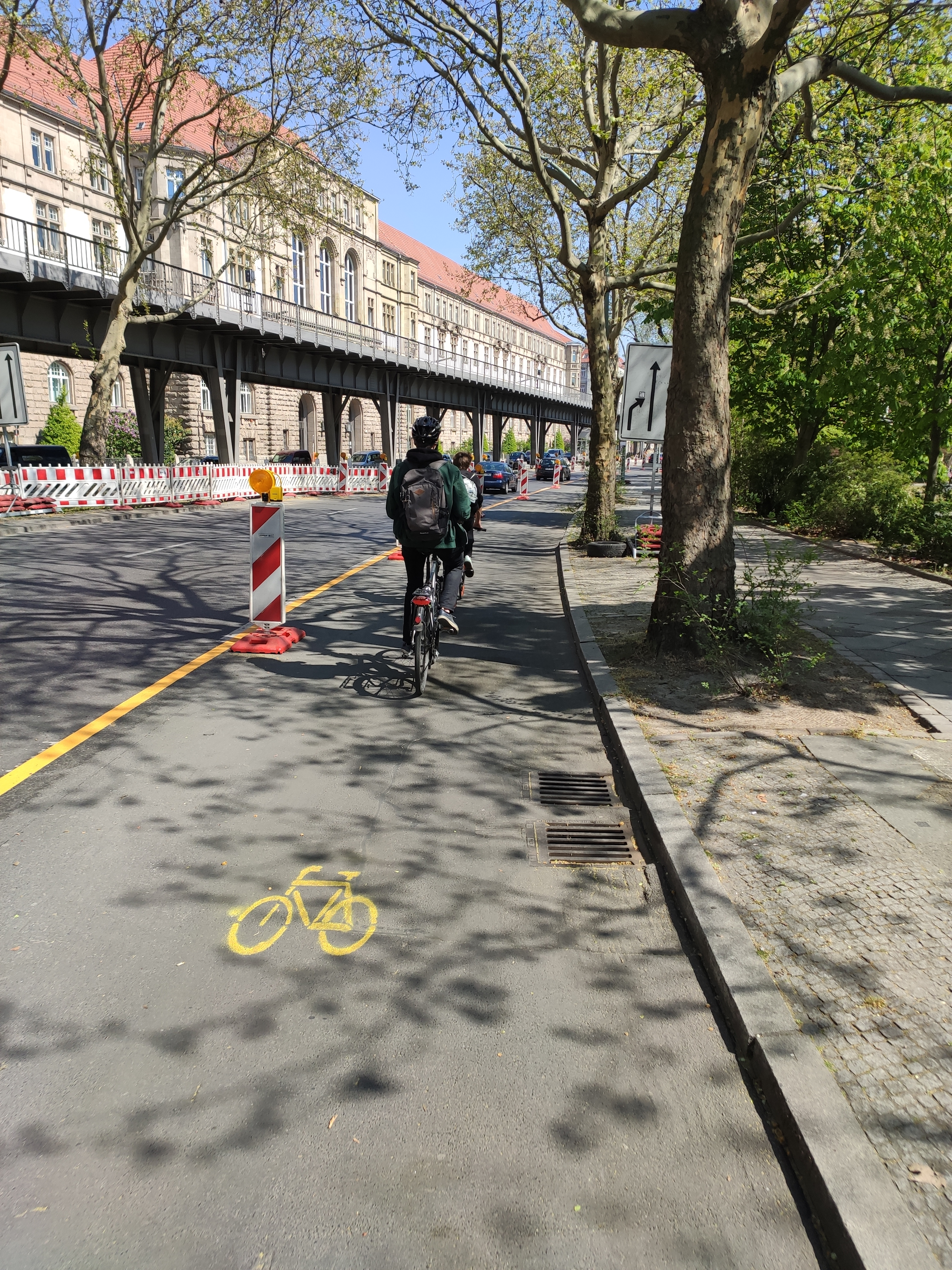
A pop up cycle lane installed in Berlin during the COVID-19 pandemic in spring 2020

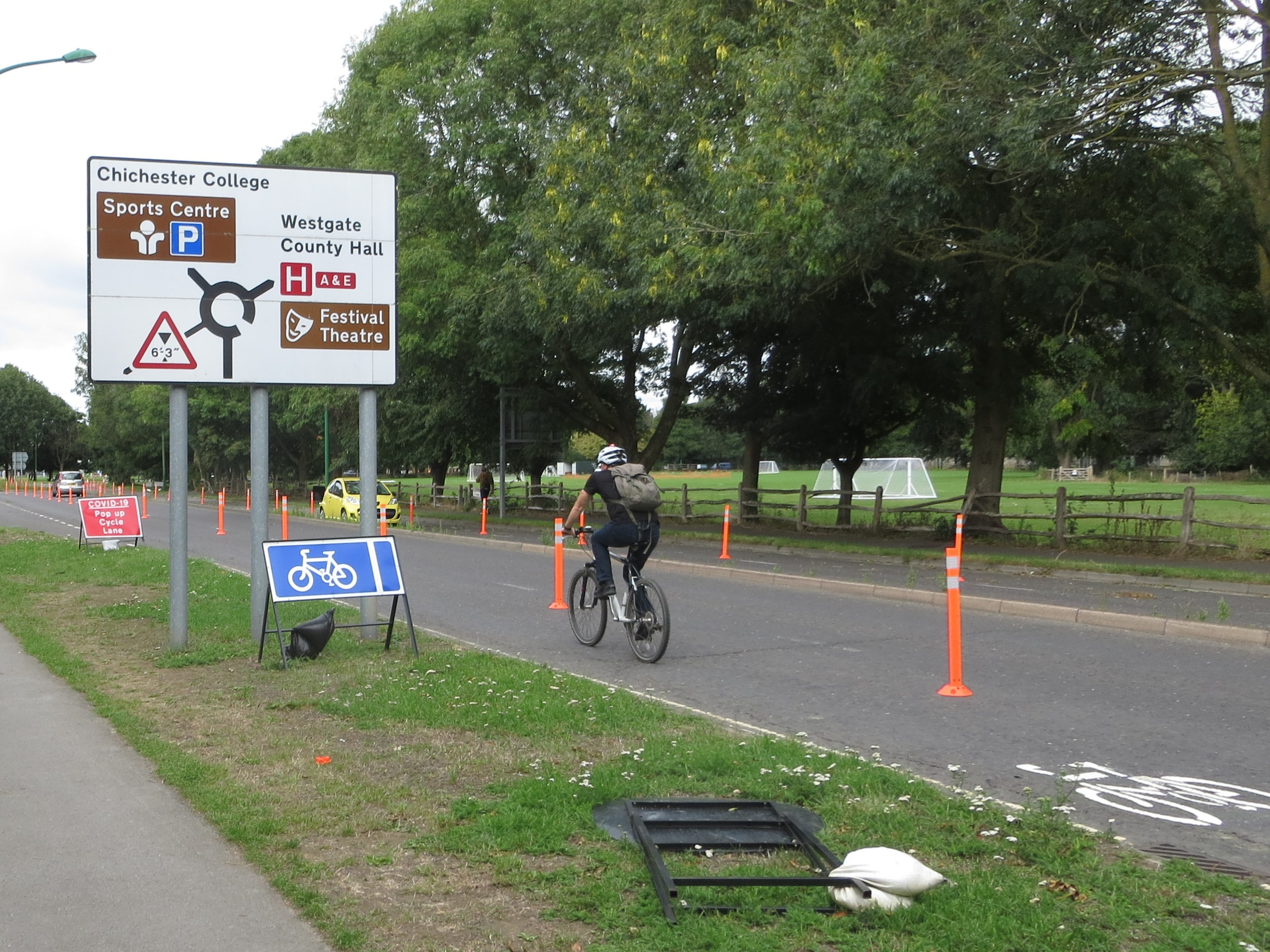
COVID-19 pop-up cycle lane in Chichester, England, August 2020

A pop-up bicycle lane (also known as a pop-up cycle path or corona cycle path) is a temporary bike lane that is used to test, pilot or trial new infrastructure to improve conditions for people riding bicycles. In the event that it is successful, interventions can be implemented permanently.

During the COVID-19 pandemic in particular, many cities set up pop-up bike lanes to quickly provide more space and safety for cyclists in poor road traffic conditions. These were usually intended as temporary cycling infrastructure for the time of the Pandemic. The purpose was primarily to provide more capacity for the rapid increase in demand for cycling and provide a viable alternative to places in close proximity to other people such as public transport.

The cycle paths, which are usually marked with yellow lines and construction site beacons, were usually established by redesignating the kerbside traffic lane or a previous parking lane as a cycle lane. In Berlin, the cost of one kilometre of pop-up cycle paths is around 9500 euros.

== History ==
The term "pop-up bike lane" originated in North America, where, for example, the US city of New York City has launched a number of experiments with short-term cycling infrastructure. The COVID-19 pandemic led to the creation of more space for bicycle traffic in Colombia, initially in the capital city of Bogotá, over a total of more than one hundred kilometres of main roads. The measure was reported internationally. In Germany, pop-up cycle paths were initially set up in the Berlin district of Friedrichshain-Kreuzberg. The first pop-up cycle path in Berlin was created on 25 March 2020 at Hallesches Ufer. The pop-up cycle paths in Berlin were laid out for a limited period until 31 May 2020, with the prospect of a transfer to a permanent cycle infrastructure in accordance with the Berlin Mobility Act. However, the deadline was extended at the end of May until the end of the year.

Mexico City announced a 54-kilometre pop up lane in Av Insurgentes and Eje 4 to create a mobility alternative to help decrease mass transit agglomeration in Metrobus lines. Its permanence will be evaluated according to use. Other Mexican cities that have created pop up bike lanes are Zapopan in Jalisco, San Pedro Garza García in Nuevo León and Puebla, Puebla.

== Concept ==
The Berlin Friedrichshain-Kreuzberg district authority recommends a concept, after which pop-up cycle paths can be set up within ten days and in eleven steps, from the identification of the areas affected, consultation with the authorities to be involved, the ordering of measures and temporary signage, to completion. The following four basic principles are applied in the design process:

- traffic separation: physical separation of foot, bicycle and car traffic beyond markings, which, if possible, does not need to be crossed by car traffic for parking
- Forgiving infrastructure: infrastructure that minimises the risk of injury in the event of misbehaviour, for example by means of safety distances between the carriageway and the kerb or guide beacons or the use of separation elements made of yielding materials
- Predictability: easily understandable and less complex traffic routing
- Network approach: Establishment of a transport network to relieve individual road sections

On roads with two lanes in both directions, the right-hand lane including a buffer zone for flowing motorised traffic is completely separated as a cycle lane and existing signs for stationary traffic are covered. Parking of motor vehicles is then no longer permitted and driving is possible on one strip for both cyclists and motorised traffic. On roads with two lanes and a parking strip in both directions, the right lane for cycle traffic, including a buffer zone for both stationary and moving motorised traffic, is separated and the parking strip is maintained. Motorised traffic can then drive on one lane in each direction. In this case, however, vehicles must cross the cycle lane when parking or entering, which is contrary to the above-mentioned principle of traffic separation. On roads with three lanes in each direction, where parking is allowed on the right lane, the right lane is separated as a cycle lane with a buffer zone to the middle lane and the middle lane is designated as a parking lane, so that flowing motorised traffic, stationary motorised traffic and cycle traffic are each provided with one lane. At crossroads with traffic lights, there are possible measures to protect straight ahead or right-hand cycle traffic from motorised traffic turning right. This includes the creation of a temporary protected intersection with temporary kerbstone extensions or alternatively traffic light phases with separate, exclusive green phases for pedestrian and bicycle traffic. If this is not possible, it is recommended to switch the green phase for cyclists before the green phase for motorised traffic.

== Political debate in Germany ==
The establishment of pop-up cycle paths in Berlin by the red-red-green senate was praised by cycling associations such as the ADFC and the associations around the Initiative Volksentscheid Fahrrad and was mostly positively received in the social media. The Berlin-Brandenburg regional association of the ADAC criticised the measure and said that the senate would exploit an emergency situation to pursue particular interests. The CDU and FDP also accused the senate of instrumentalizing the pandemic to turn traffic around. The AfD spoke of "left-wing car-hating policies" and pointed to a decrease in the number of cyclists compared to last year. The ADFC, on the other hand, stated that the total number of distances travelled in the Corona crisis had decreased overall and evaluations by the traffic information centre and public transport showed "that this was far more drastically the case with car traffic, buses and trains than with cycling".

As other cities in Germany initially did not want to set up temporary cycle paths, Deutsche Umwelthilfe sent applications to 204 city administrations, whereupon the cities of Cologne, Frankfurt am Main and Dresden, among others, wanted to consider the option. In several cities, including Stuttgart, cycling associations organised campaigns calling for the creation of pop-up cycle paths.

After a female cyclist coming from a pop-up cycle path was killed by a truck driver turning right at the intersection of Petersburger Straße and Mühsamstraße in June 2020, Siegfried Brockmann, head of the accident research department of the insurers, criticised that pop-up cycle paths alone would not provide a safe solution for the intersection areas as the main danger spots and would thus make people think they were safe. To achieve sufficient safety, the intersections would have to be rebuilt and the traffic lights changed. Brockmann also criticised the short-term installation of the cycle paths without prior measurement of the respective traffic flows. The senate administration replied that the police were involved in every installation of a pop-up cycle path, "in order to consider safety aspects of the respective location together with the road traffic authority". The situation at crossroads and junctions would only change as a result of the provisional cycle lanes to the extent that the visibility conditions would improve significantly in each case.

== Scientific impact analysis ==
A 2021 case-control study of cities found that redistributing street space for "pop-up bike lanes" during the COVID-19 pandemic leads to large additional increases in cycling. These may have substantial environmental and health benefits.

== See also ==
- Impact of the COVID-19 pandemic on the environment#Cycling
- Tactical urbanism
