= Stop Saving the Planet! =

2021 book by Jenny Price

- Author: Jenny Price
- Publisher: W. W. Norton & Company
- Publication date: April 20, 2021
- Pages: 144
- ISBN: 978-0-393-54087-1
- OCLC: 1155073312

Stop Saving the Planet!: An Environmentalist Manifesto is a 2021 book by Jenny Price, centered on how the environmental movement has resulted in greenwashing and should be reformed.

== Contents ==
Stop Saving the Planet! is, in author Jenny Price's own words, "an angry WTF critique of American environmentalist thinking and strategies—short, fun, and highly readable—that exploded" from both the presence of environmental issues in spite of "do-nothing solutions" and the detrimental nature of obsession with environmentalism. Price critiques the negative environmental impact of ostensibly eco-friendly practices as greenwashing, citing examples such as the Car Allowance Rebate System, electric cars, and products of companies such as Apple, Coca-Cola and Nestlé, concluding that there is a trend of consumerism fueling the trend. Addressing its apparent lack of environmental impact, Price voices her support for reforming environmentalism to become more "in here" than "out there".

Stop Saving the Planet! lists eleven reasons for the lack of progress and of positive reception in the environmental movement, each with its own chapter, before heading to a list of "39 Ways to Stop Saving the Planet". According to Kirkus Reviews, the book is written in a "rapidly paced, conversational narrative, loaded with bullet points, sidebars, pull quotes, and 'Scribble Zone[s]'."

== Background and reception ==
Stop Saving the Planet! was released by W. W. Norton & Company on April 20, 2021. Jenny Price had been working on the book for at least eight years up to its release, receiving a fellowship to travel to the Rachel Carson Center for Environment and Society in Munich.

Kirkus Reviews described the book as "a fun introduction to a serious topic that should serve as a starting point for further study and action" and called her use of real-world examples "the most effective parts of the book", but advised that it "should not be viewed as a comprehensive resource". Michael Kowalewski, the Lloyd McBride Professor of English & Environmental Studies of Carleton College, told MPR News of the book: "It’s a quirky, wise and funny take on our environmental dilemmas. Price reminds us that humor, rather than sanctimony or grim prophecy, may be one of our greatest resources in confronting whatever shared future we’re headed into". At an H-Net Roundtable Review, Nicole Welk-Joerger said that the book, "unleashed from the restrictions of conventional academic writing ... reads much like performance art" and "both teases and tests environmentalism", but criticized its minor tone issues, "glossy overviews and thin recommended reading lists" as detracting from its popular science genre.

The book later became the basis of a six-episode web series, Stop Saving The Planet?, on PBS Digital Studios.
