= Aircraft Meteorological Data Relay =

Aircraft Meteorological Data Relay (AMDAR) is a program initiated by the World Meteorological Organization. AMDAR is used to collect meteorological data worldwide by using commercial aircraft.

Data is collected by the aircraft navigation systems and the onboard standard temperature and static pressure probes. The data is then preprocessed before linking them down to the ground either via VHF communication (ACARS) or via satellite link ASDAR.

A detailed description is given in the AMDAR Reference Manual (WMO-No 958) available from the World Meteorological Organization, Geneva, Switzerland

The program was created in the 1990s, due to the introduction of digital avionics on airplanes. A specialized software package is installed on airplanes to collect the required data and form a standardized AMDAR report transmitted automatically at given intervals, without flight crew interaction

== Usage ==
AMDAR transmissions are most commonly used in forecast models as a supplement to radiosonde data, to aid in the plotting of upper-air data between the standard radiosonde soundings at 00Z and 12Z.
