= Jenny Price =

American writer and artist (born 1960s)

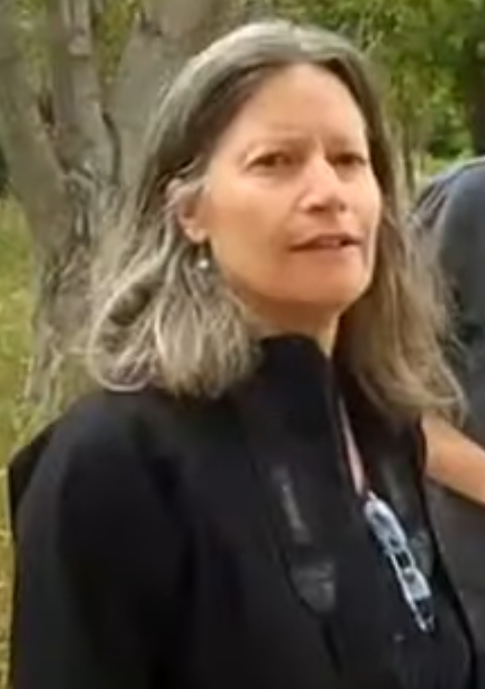
- Giving a tour of the Los Angeles River in 2011
- Born: 1960 or 1961 (age 65–66)
- Occupations: Writer; artist
- Notable work: Flight Maps; Stop Saving the Planet!
- Awards: Guggenheim Fellowship (2005)

Academic background
- Education: Princeton University; Yale University
- Thesis: Flight Maps: Encounters with Nature in Modern American Culture (1998)

Jennifer Jaye Price (born 1960/1961) is an American writer and artist. She is author of Flight Maps (2000) and Stop Saving the Planet! (2021) and is a 2005 Guggenheim Fellow.

== Biography ==
Jenny Price was born in 1960 or 1961 and is from St. Louis. Her father was an attorney involved in the civil rights movement, defending people blacklisted by McCarthyism. She obtained her BA in biology from Princeton University in 1985. As she noted in a 2020 interview, she "discovered history my last semester in college very accidentally", and discovered her own self-described nature as a "born historian". She later attended Yale University for her graduate studies, where she studied with William Cronon and obtained a PhD in history in 1998. Her doctoral dissertation was titled Flight Maps: Encounters with Nature in Modern American Culture.

In 2000, she published Flight Maps, a book on American culture's history with nature. She was a 2005 Guggenheim Fellow and a 2013 Rachel Carson Center for Environment and Society Fellow. She authored a second book, Stop Saving the Planet!, focused on greenwashing and released by W. W. Norton & Company in 2021.

She co-founded the public art collectives LA Urban Rangers and St. Louis Division, and as part of the former took people to safari-like gatherings at public beaches in the local area. She co-developed an app with Escape Apps to help find public access points to public beaches in Malibu, California. She has worked as a research fellow at the Sam Fox School of Design & Visual Arts.

After living in Los Angeles, she moved back to her native St. Louis in 2016.

== Bibliography ==
- Flight Maps (2000) (Note: Reviews of this book:)
- Stop Saving the Planet! (2021)
