= 2020 in the environment and environmental sciences =

This is an article of notable issues relating to the terrestrial environment of Earth in 2020. They relate to environmental events such as natural disasters, environmental sciences such as ecology and geoscience with a known relevance to contemporary influence of humanity on Earth, environmental law, conservation, environmentalism with major worldwide impact and environmental issues.

== Events ==
Date / period	Type of event	Event	Topics	Image
	Report	The Global Forest Resources Assessment (FRA), which is published every demi-decade, for 2020 is published.		
January 13 (February 24–29)	Policy	The UN Convention on Biological Diversity drafted proposal to prevent reverse biodiversity decline that risks the survival of humanity: Almost a third of the world's oceans and land should be protected by the end of the decade.		
February	Analysis	JPMorgan Chase report on the economic risks of human-caused global heating warns clients that the climate crisis threatens the survival of humanity and that the planet.		
February	Analysis	The UN issues a warning about the numbers of desert locusts in East Africa.		
June 8	International day	World Oceans Day: its theme was 'Innovation for a sustainable ocean'.		
July 15	Analysis	The United Nations warns that the floating oil storage and offloading vessel that is moored in the Red Sea north of the Yemeni city of Al Hudaydah, FSO Safer could spill four times as much oil as the Exxon Valdez oil spill.		
August 22	International day	The Earth Overshoot Day takes place more than three weeks later than 2019, due to coronavirus induced lockdowns around the world. The president of the Global Footprint Network claims that the COVID-19 pandemic by itself is one of the manifestations of "ecological imbalance".		
September 8	Report	The European Environment Agency reports that environmental factors such as air pollution and heatwaves contributed to around 13% of all human deaths in EU countries in 2012 (~630,000).		
September 9	Report	The WMO publishes a high-level brief compilation of the latest climate science information from the WMO, GCP, UNESCO-IOC, IPCC, UNEP and the Met Office. The report, which is not published under an open license, is subdivided into 7 chapters which each have a list of key messages.		
September 10	Report	According to the 2020 Living Planet Index report, vertebrate populations have declined by 68% since 1970 by 2016.		
October 28	Observation	Scientists report finding a coral reef measuring 500 m in height, located at the northern tip of Australia's Great Barrier Reef, the first discovery of its kind in 120 years.		
November 6	Activity / Development	Scientists begin collecting living fragments, tissue and DNA samples of corals from the Great Barrier Reef for a biobank for potential future restoration and rehabilitation activities.		
November 21	Activity / Development	Sentinel-6 Michael Freilich is launched into orbit, to monitor sea levels in higher detail than ever before. The satellite's resolution will allow measuring of water depths closer to the shore, which has long been an area of uncertainty.		

=== Environmental policies approved ===
- From 1 January 2020, ships will only be permitted to use fuel oil with a very low sulfur content. The International Maritime Organization estimates that the new limit of 0.5% sulfur content, down from 3.5%, will cut sulfur dioxide emissions from ships by about 8.5 million tonnes.
- The Pacific nation of Palau bans sun cream that is harmful to corals and sea life in January 2020.

=== Environmental disasters ===
Date / period	Type of event	Event	Topics	Image
January	Wildfires	The Australian wildfires in January 2020 were intense. Thousands of people have evacuated from north-east Victoria, East Gippsland, and the south coast of NSW. Australia's bushfire crisis is expected to contribute up to 2% of what scientists forecast will be one of the largest annual increases in atmospheric carbon dioxide on record. In the forecast by the British Met Office climate gas concentration is projected to peak at more than 417 parts per million in May 2020.		
January	Storm	Storm Gloria in Spain: Seawater flooded ca 30sq km of rice plants, kills people, blocks roads, and causes power cuts and damaged beaches around Barcelona, Valencia and on the Balearic Islands.		
January 25	Earthquake	2020 Elazığ earthquake with a magnitude of 6.8 kills at least 20 people in eastern Turkey.		
January	Wildfires / deforestation	Deforestation in the Amazon rainforest in Brazil more than doubled in January 2020 compared with the previous year, the Amazon rainforest biodiversity is huge and is the most species-rich biome, and tropical forests in the Americas are consistently more species rich than the wet forests in Africa and Asia. Deforestation in the Amazon rainforest may influence the climate worldwide.		
February	Storm	European Storm Ciara — known as Sabine in Germany and Switzerland and Elsa in Norway — stops aviation and train traffic in many countries because of in maximum over 30 m/s wind speeds. Storm Ciara helps plane beat transatlantic flight record from New York to London in 4 hours and 56 minutes.		
February	Mass coral bleaching	National Oceanic and Atmospheric Administration warns of the massive coral bleaching in Great Barrier Reef. After mid February model forecasts suggested that "2020 is likely to be the most extensive coral bleaching event that we have seen so far" on the reef. In 2016 and 2017, back-to-back bleaching killed about half the reef's corals.		
February	Storm / flooding	Hundreds of properties are flooded in the UK after the Storm Dennis In February 2020. Storm hit large areas including the United Kingdom, The United States, Canada & Mexico, Ireland, Sweden and the Netherlands.		
May 29	Oil spill	The Norilsk oil spill begins after a fuel storage tank at Norilsk-Taimyr Energy's Thermal Power Plant No. 3 (owned by Nornickel) failed, flooding local rivers with up to 17,500 tonnes of diesel oil. President Vladimir Putin declared a state of emergency in early June. The incident has been described as the second-largest oil spill in modern Russian history, after the 1994 Komi pipeline spill.		
July 25, August 15	Oil spill	The MV Wakashio oil spill begins offshore of Pointe d'Esny, south of Mauritius, after the Japanese bulk carrier Wakashio ran aground on a coral reef on 25 July 2020 at around 16:00 UTC. The ship began to leak fuel oil in the following weeks, and broke apart in mid August. Although much of the oil on board Wakashio was pumped out before she broke in half, an estimated 1,000 tonnes of oil spilled into the ocean in what was called by some scientists the worst environmental disaster ever in Mauritius.		

=== Environmental sciences ===
Date / period	Type	Description	Topics	Image
January 8	Mechanics, Projections	Scientists publish evidence from Siberian caves suggesting that summer sea ice in the Arctic Ocean plays an essential role in stabilising permafrost and its large store of carbon.	[Permafrost] [Arctic Ocean]	
January 13	Statistics / records	A study finds that ocean temperatures were at a record high in 2019 and underwent the largest single-year increase of the decade.	[Temperature record] [Ocean warming]	
January 21	Observation	A study finds record high emissions of the potent greenhouse gas, HFC-23.	[Greenhouse gases]	
January 21	Analysis	Researchers present evidence that the platypus is at risk of extinction, due to a combination of water resource development, land clearing, climate change and increasingly severe periods of drought.	[Extinction] [Platypus]	
January 21	Assessment	A study finds that man-made ozone-depleting substances (ODS) caused the largest share of Arctic warming, one-third of global warming and roughly half of Arctic warming and sea ice loss from 1955 to 2005.	Ozone layer Global warming [Arctic]	
January 28	Analysis	A new study finds that many of Earth's biodiverse ecosystems are in danger of collapse. The study mapped over 100 high-risk ecosystems and habitats in specific locations, and noted the highly detrimental patterns in each one that result from climate change and local human activities.	[Ecosystem collapse] [Global warming]	
February 5	Ecological engineering	In a study researchers assess that Extant-Native Trophic (ENT), a trophic rewilding approach which restores lost species to ecosystems, can help mitigate climate change. This form of rewilding would restore large-bodied herbivore and carnivore guilds which could reduce methane emissions and according to the study could be an "important complementary strategy to natural climate solutions to ensure other nature-based benefits to biodiversity conservation and society are also delivered".	[Global warming] [Semi-natural solutions] [Conservation]	
February 6	Statistics / records	A record-breaking 18.3 °C (64.9 °F) temperature is recorded at an Argentine weather base on the northern tip of Antarctica, according to the World Meteorological Organization (WMO). The previous record was 17.5 °C (63.5 °F) in March 2015. On February 9 another Antarctic weather research station, located on Seymour Island registered a temperature of 20.75 Celsius, considered to be a "likely record" and requiring some open questions to be answered before being confirmed.	[Temperature record] [Antarctica]	
February 10	Mechanics, Mapping	Scientists of NASA's Arctic Boreal Vulnerability Experiment (ABoVE) publish conclusions from mapped methane hotspots of an Arctic 30,000-km^{2} study domain. They used the AVIRIS—NG instrument on flights over the Arctic to map the hotspots and quantified a power law dependence of the emissions on distance to nearest standing water.	[Methane emissions]	
February 11	Projections	Researchers report that their projections show that the number of compound hot extremes that combine daytime and nighttime heat could quadruple by 2100 in the Northern Hemisphere even if emissions are brought down to meet the Paris climate deal goals.	[Global warming] [Extreme heat]	
February 18	Projections	Scientists report warning signs of flank instability of the Ecuadorian Tungurahua volcano. A potential collapse of the western flank could result in a large landslide.	[Volcanos]	
February 24	Assessment, Statistics / records	A study of the 2019–20 Australian bushfire season, published in Nature, finds that 21% of Australia's forests (excluding Tasmania) have burnt down, an amount described in the journal as "unprecedented" and "greatly exceed[ing] previous fires both within Australia and globally" in terms of scale within the last 20 years. Other characteristics that distinguish the fires from similar ones include that they happened in populated areas instead of remote areas in e.g. Siberia – due to which a large number of people were affected by smoke of the fires – and their intensity and geographical spread across the country.	[Wildfires, Australia]	
March 4	Attribution	Scientists of the international World Weather Attribution project publicize a study which found that human-caused climate change had an influence on the 2019-20 Australian wildfires by causing high-risk conditions that made widespread burning at least 30 percent more likely. They comment on the results, stating that climate change probably had more effects on the fires which couldn't be attributed using their climate simulations and that not all drivers of the fires showed imprints of anthropogenic climate change.	[Wildfires, Australia] [Global warming]	
March 4	Analysis, Projections	A global scientific collaboration of ca. 100 institutions publishes their analysis of three decades of tree growth and death in 565 undisturbed tropical forests across Africa and the Amazon. The researchers found that the overall uptake of carbon into Earth's intact tropical forests peaked in the 1990s, dropped by one-third on average by the 2010s and may have started a downward trend. While extra carbon dioxide boosts tree growth, the effect is countered by negative impacts of higher temperatures and droughts which slow growth and can kill trees. Their models project a long-term decline in the African carbon sink and the Amazonas likely becoming a carbon source, rather than sink, in the mid-2030s.	[Global warming] [Natural solutions] [Tropical forest]	
March 10	Mechanics, Analysis, Projections	Scientists publish evidence that even large ecosystems can collapse on relatively short timescales. Their paper suggests that once a 'point of no return' is reached, the Amazon rainforest could shift to a savannah-type mixture of trees and grass within 50 years.	[Ecosystem collapse]	
March 10	Analysis, Assessment	Researchers show when, where, and how mangrove forests reduce risks of flooding at coastlines worldwide, evaluate the economic value thereof and illustrate ways to fund mangrove protection with economic incentives, insurance, and climate risk financing.	[Flooding] [Natural solutions]	
March 16	Analysis, Assessment	Researchers publish a paper in which they evaluate the potential for carbon sequestration in soils and found that properly managed soils would be a natural climate solution which could contribute a quarter of absorption on land – 5.5 billion tonnes annually. Roughly 40 percent of this absorption could be achieved by preserving existing soil instead of using it for agriculture and plantation growth. The researchers recommend strategies for slowing or halting ongoing expansion of such land-use and shifting incentive structures in agriculture towards payments for ecosystem-related services.	[Soils] [Global warming] [Natural solutions]	
March 19	Observation	Satellite data show that air pollution was reduced significantly in countries worldwide after lockdowns and other interventions due to the COVID-19 pandemic. The sudden shift has been called the "largest scale experiment ever" in terms of the reduction of industrial emissions.	[Air pollution] [Impact assessment]	
March 26	Observation	A third mass coral bleaching event in five years is recorded at the Great Barrier Reef.	[Coral bleaching]	
April 1	Analysis, Assessment, Attribution	A scientific review finds that substantial recovery for most components of marine ecosystems within two to three decades can be achieved if climate change is addressed adequately and efficient interventions are deployed at large scale. It documents the recovery of marine populations, habitats and ecosystems following past conservation interventions, identifies nine components integral to conservation and recovery and recommend actions along with opportunities, benefits, possible roadblocks and remedial actions. The researchers caution about a narrow window of opportunity in which decisions can choose between "a legacy of a resilient and vibrant ocean or an irreversibly disrupted ocean". They assess the goal 14 of the Sustainable Development Goals of the United Nations to be a "doable Grand Challenge for humanity, an ethical obligation and a smart economic objective to achieve a sustainable future".	[Global warming] [Feasibility assessment]	
April 6	Observation	Scientists using data from the Copernicus Sentinel-5P satellite report a "mini-hole" in the ozone layer over the Arctic, likely caused by unusual atmospheric conditions, including freezing temperatures in the stratosphere.	[Ozone layer]	
April 7	Observation	Scientists report the results of a survey of the Great Barrier Reef. For the first time, all its three regions experienced severe bleaching. On March 25 – day three of the nine-day survey – they reported its third mass bleaching event within five years.	[Coral bleaching]	
April 13	Observation	A study which included aircraft measurements of methane emissions from offshore oil and gas platforms collected over the U.S. Gulf of Mexico in January 2018 indicates that the United States via the Environmental Protection Agency Greenhouse Gas Inventory (GHGI) underestimated methane emissions at the time from these sites by a factor of 2. They attribute the discrepancy between regional airborne estimates and their data as well as their estimations for total methane emissions from these sites and the GHGI estimations adjusted for 2018 to incomplete platform counts and emission factors that underestimate emissions for shallow water platforms and don't account for disproportionately high emissions from large shallow water facilities.	[Methane emissions] [Fossil energy]	
April 15	Observation, Statistics / records	Scientists report that the Greenland ice sheet lost around 600 billion tonnes of water in 2019, which would raise sea levels by about 1.5 millimetres and make up ca. 40% of the year's total sea level rise. The runoff ranked second only after the exceptional year 2012. The study affirms the exceptional nature of the 2019 season and shows that high-pressure atmospheric conditions over Greenland due to changing atmospheric circulation patterns – which have become more frequent due to climate change – were a cause of the melting next to the warmer temperatures. This suggests that scientists may be underestimating the melting of Greenland's ice – likely by a factor of two according to co-author Xavier Fettweis.	[Sea level rise] [Greenland ice]	
April 16	Meta	Australia's Morrison government announces the launch of the research and development phase of its Reef Restoration and Adaptation Program after a two-year feasibility study. The selected 43 strategies of the program include climate engineering concepts such as brightening clouds with salt crystals, technologies to increase survival rate of coral larvae, coral seeding strategies and methods to facilitate faster recovery of coral reefs. The Australian Marine Conservation Society welcomed the work but remarked that policies which address global warming – the main cause of increasingly severe and frequent mass coral bleaching events – should be prioritised, that the projects could take years or decades to develop and that solutions to climate change – such as renewable energies – are already available.	[Geo-engineering] [R&D]	
April 17	Statistics / records, Assessment	Researchers report that the 2000–2018 Southwestern North American drought was the second driest 19-year period since 800 CE, exceeded only by a late-1500s megadrought and that anthropogenic trends in temperature, relative humidity, and precipitation estimated from 31 climate models account for approximately 47% of the 2000–2018 drought severity.	[Droughts] [Global warming]	
April 19	Projections	Researchers report that the Arctic Ocean will likely be occasionally sea-ice free in summers before 2050 in scenarios where global warming is kept below 2 °C.	[Arctic Ocean] [Effects of global warming]	
April 20	Analysis, Assessment	Researchers report that by the end of the 21st century people could be exposed to avoidable indoor CO2 levels of up to 1400 ppm, which would be triple the amount commonly experienced outdoors today and, according to the authors, may cut humans' basic decision-making ability by ~25% and complex strategic thinking by ~50%.	[Effects of global warming]	
April 22	Observation	Microplastic pollution is recorded in Antarctic sea ice for the first time.	[Microplastic pollution] [Antarctica]	
April 22	Mechanics	After studying the 2018 Kīlauea volcano eruption researchers report that extreme rainfall can modulate volcanic activity.	[Volcanos]	
April 22	Observation	A study using satellite data shows that oil and gas operations in the United States' Permian Basin are releasing the greenhouse gas methane at twice the average rate found in earlier studies of 11 other major oil and gas regions of the United States. According to the authors insufficient infrastructure to process and transport natural gas may be one cause of the high rate.	[Methane emissions]	
April 30	Analysis	The first results from ice-monitoring satellite ICESat-2 are published, showing that melting in Antarctica and Greenland has contributed 14 mm (0.55 in) of global sea level rise since 2003.	[Sea level rise]	
April 30	Projections	Scientists report that one of the climate models – the CMIP6 model CESM2 – is not supported by paleoclimate records. Comparing simulations of this model with geological evidence suggests that its climate sensitivity is too high. This indicates that this model may not perform realistically at high CO2 concentrations, overestimating global warming at high levels of CO2 where its equilibrium climate sensitivity is 5.3 °C and modelled tropical land temperature exceeds 55 °C. They recommend using paleoclimate constraints of past warm and cold climates to benchmark the performance of CMIP6 climate models.	[Climate models]	
May 4	Projections	Researchers project that regions inhabited by a third of the human population could become as hot as the hottest parts of the Sahara within 50 years without a change in patterns of population growth and without migration, unless greenhouse gas emissions are reduced. The projected annual average temperature of above 29 °C for these regions would be outside the "human temperature niche" and the most affected regions have little adaptive capacity as of 2020.	[Effects of global warming] [Extreme heat]	
May 5	Mechanics, Projections	Researchers report that the North Magnetic Pole is moving due to elongation of one of two lobes of negative magnetic flux on Earth's core-mantle boundary alongside magnetic changes and that it will likely move 390–660 km further on its current trajectory, on which it is accelerating, towards Siberia over the next decade.	[North pole] [Earth's magnetic field]	
May 8	Observation, Projections	Researchers show that wet-bulb temperatures (TW) above the upper physiological limit of humans have already occurred in some coastal subtropical locations despite climate models projecting such to occur only by the mid-21st century. These combinations of humidity and heat above a TW of 35 °C are likely to be fatal even to fit and healthy people when exposure is sustained and have more than doubled in frequency since 1979 overall, weather station data shows.	[Extreme heat]	
May 13	Ecological engineering	Scientists report to have evolved 10 clonal strains of a common coral microalgal endosymbionts at elevated temperatures for 4 years, increasing their thermal tolerance for climate resilience. Three of the strains increased the corals' bleaching tolerance after reintroduction into coral host larvae. Their strains and findings may potentially be relevant for the adaptation to and mitigation of climate change and further tests of algal strains in adult colonies across a range of coral species are planned.	[Coral bleaching] [Semi-natural solutions]	
May 19	Observation	Researchers report a temporary 17% drop in daily global CO_{2} emissions by early April 2020 compared with the mean 2019 levels during the COVID-19 forced confinements. At the peak of the interventions, where 89% of global emissions were in areas under some confinement, emissions in individual countries decreased by –26% on average. Estimations on the impact on 2020 annual emissions are between -2% and -13%. The largest reductions were due to reductions of surface transport. Despite this on May 4 UN Climate Change reports that the CO_{2} concentration in the atmosphere reached an all-time daily high of the ca. 60-year record on May 3.	[CO_{2} emissions]	
May 20	Analysis, Projections	Researchers report estimations of green snow algae community biomass and distribution along the Antarctic Peninsula and project a net increase in their extent and biomass and coastal Antarctica turning more green due to climate change.	[Effects of global warming] [Antarctica]	
June 1	Analysis, Assessment, Mechanics	Researchers publish a study using data on vertebrates on the brink to extinction and on vertebrates that recently became extinct, in which they conclude that a human-caused potential sixth mass extinction, which was claimed to be emerging by researchers of the study in 2015, is likely accelerating and suggest a number of reasons for that including extinctions causing further extinctions. They reemphasize "extreme urgency of taking much-expanded worldwide actions".	[Extinction]	
June 8	Attribution	Researchers report results consistent with the hypothesis that pesticides contribute to monarch butterfly declines in the western United States.	[Pesticides] [Extinction]	
June 13	Projections	Scientists report that early supercomputer climate modelling results that are being compiled for the sixth assessment by the United Nations Intergovernmental Panel on Climate Change by more than 20 institutions due to be released in 2021 suggest a higher climate sensitivity than previously believed with 25% of the models showing a sharp upward shift from 3 °C to 5 °C in climate sensitivity supporting or revising worst-case projections of over 5 °C of global warming. The projections of more future warming may be due to a role of clouds. According to a study published on 24 June cloud feedbacks and cloud-aerosol interactions are the most likely contributors to the high values and increased range of equilibrium climate sensitivity in the CMIP6 model.	[Climate models]	
June 17	Projections	Results of a study indicate greater regional anthropogenic carbon storage in and ocean acidification of the Arctic Ocean than previously projected.	[Global warming] [Arctic Ocean]	
June 19	Analysis, Assessment, Mechanics, Economic engineering	Scientists, as part of a World Scientists' Warning to Humanity-associated series, warn that worldwide growth in affluence has increased resource use and pollutant emissions with affluent citizens of the world – in terms of e.g. resource-intensive consumption – being responsible for most negative environmental impacts and central to a transition to safer, sustainable conditions. They summarise evidence, present solution approaches and state that far-reaching lifestyle changes need to complement technological advancements and that existing societies, economies and cultures incite consumption expansion and that the structural imperative for growth in competitive market economies inhibits societal change.	[Global warming] [Economics] [Behaviour] [Society] [Semi-natural solutions]	
June 23	Statistics / records	The World Meteorological Organization announces a possible new temperature-record of 38 °C north of the Arctic Circle, which it seeks to verify and assess. It was reported on 20 June in Verkhoyansk, Russia amid a prolonged Siberian heatwave and an increase in wildfire activity.	[Temperature record]	
July 6	Observations, Analysis, Statistics / records	Scientists report that analysis of simulations and a recent observational field model show that maximum rates of directional change of Earth's magnetic field reached ~10° per year – almost 100 times faster than current changes and ~10 times faster than previously thought.	[Earth's magnetic field]	
July 3	Analysis	Via analysis of satellite images, scientists show that certified "sustainable" palm oil production resulted in deforestation of tropical forests of Sumatra and Borneo and endangered mammals' habitat degradation in the last 30 years.	Palm oil [Certification] [Tropical forest]	
July 8	Assessment	The World Meteorological Organisation (WMO) announces that it assesses a 20% chance that global warming compared to pre-industrial levels will exceed 1.5 °C in at least one year within the five years of 2020–2024. 1.5 °C is often considered to be a key threshold of global warming and nations have agreed to attempt limiting contemporary climate change to it under the Paris Agreement.	[Global warming]	
July 10	Observation, Projections	Scientists report that phytoplankton primary production in the Arctic Ocean increased by 57% between 1998 and 2018 due to higher concentrations, suggesting the ocean may be able to support higher trophic level production and additional carbon fixation in the future.	[Arctic Ocean]	
July 15	Analysis, Visualization	In two studies researchers of the Global Carbon Project summarise and analyse new estimates of the global methane budget and provide data and insights on sources and sinks for the geographical regions and economic sectors where the rising anthropogenic methane emissions have changed the most over recent decades. According to the studies, global methane emissions for the 2008 to 2017 decade increased by almost 10 percent compared to the previous decade.	[Methane emissions]	
July 22	Observation, Mechanics	Scientists confirm the first active leak of sea-bed methane in Antarctica and report that "the rate of microbial succession may have an unrealized impact on greenhouse gas emission from marine methane reservoirs".	[Methane emissions] [Microbes] [Antarctica]	
July 22	Observation	Scientists report results of a survey of 371 reefs in 58 nations estimating the conservation status of reef sharks globally. No sharks have been observed on almost 20% of the surveyed reefs and shark depletion was strongly associated with both socio-economic conditions and conservation measures. Sharks are considered to be a vital part of the ocean ecosystem.	[Sharks]	
July 31	Projections, Observation	Two ice caps in Nunavut, Canada have disappeared completely, confirming predictions of a study published in 2017 that they would melt completely within five years.	[Global warming]	
August 1	Observation	Brazil's National Institute for Space Research reports that satellite data shows that the number of fires in the Amazon increased by 28% to ~6,800 fires in July compared to the ~5,300 wildfires in July 2019. This indicates a, potentially worsened, repeat of 2019's accelerated destruction of one of the world's largest protectable buffers against global warming.	[Wildfires, Brazil]	
August 5	Observation, Analysis	The British Antarctic Survey reports that emperor penguin colonies in Antarctica are nearly 20% more numerous than previously thought, with new discoveries made using satellite mapping technology.	[Antarctica] [Animals]	
August 5	Assessment, Statistics / records	New Guinea is determined to be the world's most floristically diverse island with well over 13,000 confirmed species of vascular plants recorded thus far, surpassing that of Madagascar.	[Biodiversity]	
August 6	Observation	The Canadian Ice Service reports that the Milne Ice Shelf, the last fully intact ice shelf in the Canadian Arctic, has collapsed after losing more than 40% of its area in just two days.	[Arctic] [Global warming]	
August 7	Analysis, Assessment, Projections, Policy, Economic engineering	A study concludes that the direct effect of the response to the pandemic on global warming will likely be negligible, with an estimated cooling of around 0.01 ±0.005 °C by 2030 and that a well-designed economic recovery could avoid future warming of 0.3 °C by 2050. The study indicates that systemic change for "decarbonization" of humanity's economic structures is required for a substantial impact on global warming.	[Global warming]	
August 12	Statistics / records	The latest State of the Climate report finds that 2010 to 2019 was the hottest decade on record globally, with an increase of 0.39 °C (0.7 °F) above the long-term average, and 2019 either the second or third warmest year on record.	[Temperature records]	
August 12	Observation	Scientists report that bacteria that feed on air discovered 2017 in Antarctica are likely not limited to Antarctica after discovering the two genes previously linked to their "atmospheric chemosynthesis" in soil of two other similar cold desert sites, which provides further information on this carbon sink and further strengthens the extremophile evidence that supports the potential existence of microbial life on alien planets.	[Carbon sink] [Soil]	
August 13	Statistics / records	July 2020 is tied as the second-warmest July on record, with a record low Arctic sea ice extent for the month, in a report by the National Oceanic and Atmospheric Administration.	[Temperature records] [Arctic]	
August 13	Analysis, Assessment	Melting of the Greenland ice sheet is shown to have passed the point of no return, based on 40 years of satellite data, by scientists at Ohio State University. The switch to a dynamic state of sustained mass loss resulted from widespread retreat in 2000–2005.	[Global warming]	
August 19	Analysis, Projections	An analysis indicates that sustainable seafood could increase by 36–74% by 2050 compared to current yields and that whether or not these production potentials are realized sustainably depends on a number of factors.	[Seafood]	
August 19	Analysis, Attribution	Researchers report that widespread declines in Pacific salmon size resulted in substantial losses to ecosystems and people, which they estimate, and are associated with factors that include climate change and competition with growing numbers of wild and hatchery salmon.	[Seafood]	
August 19	Mechanics	Researchers provide explanations for variations in the rate of global mean sea-level rise since 1900 and report that dam building in the 20th century offset factors that would have led to a higher rate during the 1970s, implying that no additional processes are required to explain the observed major variations.	[Sea-level rise]	
August 20	Observation, Analysis, Statistics / records, Mechanics	Scientists report that the Greenland ice sheet lost a record amount of 532 billion metric tons of ice during 2019, surpassing the old record of 464 billion metric tons in 2012 and returning to high melt rates, and provide explanations for the reduced ice loss in 2017 and 2018.	[Global warming]	
August 24	Analysis, Assessment	A study finds that almost 300 million people live on tropical forest restoration opportunity land in the Global South, constituting a large share of low-income countries' populations, and argues for prioritized inclusion of "local communities" in forest restoration projects.	[Forests]	
August 24	Analysis, Assessment, Projections	Researchers assess potential global soil erosion rates by water due to projected climate- and land use-change for multiple SSP-RCP scenarios, indicating that global soil erosion by water may increase 30-66% between 2015 and 2070 and that the greatest increases will occur in areas with tropical climates, which could inform strategies for soil conservation.	[Soil]	
August 31	Observation, Analysis	Scientists report that New Guinea singing dogs, known for their characteristic vocalization, are not extinct in the wild as was previously commonly believed after analyzing blood samples of specimens found in highlands of New Guinea.	[Animals]	
August 31	Observations, Projections	Scientists report that observed ice-sheet losses in Greenland and Antarctica track worst-case scenarios of the IPCC Fifth Assessment Report's sea-level rise projections.	[Sea-level rise]	
September 1	Analysis, Projections	Researchers report that mining for renewable energy production will increase threats to biodiversity and publish a map of areas that contain needed materials as well as estimations of their overlaps with "Key Biodiversity Areas", "Remaining Wilderness" and "Protected Areas". The authors assess that careful strategic planning is needed.	[Renewable energy] [biodiversity] [map] [protected areas]	
September 2	Mechanics	Researchers in China demonstrate how microplastic pollution contaminates the soil and harms the abundance of common species, such as microarthropods and nematodes, as well as disrupting carbon and nutrient cycling.	[microplastic pollution] [soil]	
September 2	Mechanics	Scientists report that asphalt currently is a significant and largely overlooked source of air pollution in urban areas, especially during hot and sunny periods.	[air pollution]	
September 3	Mechanics	A study highlights the importance of old bulls in African savannah elephants and, according to the study, raises concerns over the removal of old bulls as currently occurring in both legal trophy hunting and illegal poaching.	[poaching] [animals]	
September 4	Analysis, Assessment	Scientists publish a map of terrestrial areas where some level of protection or sustainable management as a "Global Safety Net" could achieve various climate and conservation goals.	[map] [climate change] [protected areas]	
September 4	Mechanics	Scientists report that their results indicate that ocean carbon uptake has been underestimated in most ocean models, which may be beneficial in terms of climate change mitigation but problematic in terms of ocean acidification.	[Ocean] [climate change]	
September 4	Mechanics, Analysis, Projections	After investigating how mammalian extinction rates have changed over the past 126,000 years, scientists report that mainly (about 96% prediction accuracy) human population size and/or specific human activities, not climate change, cause global mammal extinctions and predict a near future "rate escalation of unprecedented magnitude".	[mammal extinctions]	
September 7	Review, Analysis	A scientific review by German and Luxembourgian NGOs shows that electromagnetic radiation – such as mobile phone and Wi-Fi radiation – likely has a negative impact on, declining, insects, with 72 of 83 analyzed studies finding an effect.	[insect decline]	
September 7	Analysis, Assessment, Projections	Researchers report the magnitudes of climate change mitigation effects of shifting global food production and consumption to plant-based diets which are mainly composed of foods that require only a small fraction of the land and CO_{2} emissions required for meat and dairy. They conclude that such changes could offset CO_{2} emissions equal to the past 9 to 16 years of fossil fuel emissions in nations, they grouped into 4 types, and provide a map of regional opportunities.	[climate change] [Food]	
September 10	Analysis, Assessment	Scientists show that "immediate efforts, consistent with the broader sustainability agenda but of unprecedented ambition and coordination, could enable the provision of food for the growing human population while reversing the global terrestrial biodiversity trends caused by habitat conversion" and recommend measures such as addressing drivers of land-use change, and for increasing the extent of land under conservation management and shares of plant-based diets.	[Biodiversity] [Food]	
September 11	Observations	INPE reports that 1,359 km^{2} of the Brazilian Amazon have burned off in August, which may put the effectiveness of the contemporary response against the deforestation – such as considerations of economic interventions and the current military operation – into question. On 13 September preliminary data based on satellite images, indicate that 1.5 million hectares have burned in the Pantanal region since the start of August, surpassing the previous fire season record from 2005. On September 15 it was reported that 23,500 km^{2} – ~12% of the Pantanal – have burned off in 2020. The 6,087 km^{2} of lost Amazon rainforest in 2020 as of early September – ~95% of the period in 2019 – is about the size of Palestine.	[Wildfires] [Tropical forest] [Wetlands]	
September 22	Meta, Analysis	Researchers report that over half of endangered species' proposed recovery plan budgets are allocated to research and monitoring (R&M), that species with higher proportions of such budgets have poorer recovery outcomes and provide recommendations for ensuring that "conservation programs emphasize action or [R&M] that directly informs action".	[Endangered species] [Biodiversity]	
September 28	Observations, Analysis, Assessment	Scientists warn that an "international effort is needed to manage a changing fire regime in the vulnerable Arctic", reporting that satellite data shows how the Arctic fire regime is changing. On 3 September EU institutions reported that, according to satellite data, the Arctic fires already far surpassed the total of CO_{2} emissions for the 2019 season.	[Wildfires]	
October 5	Observation, Analysis	Scientist publish what may be the first scientific estimate of how much microplastic currently resides in Earth's seafloor, after investigating six areas of ~3 km depth ~300 km off the Australian coast. They found the highly variable microplastic counts to be proportionate to plastic on the surface and the angle of the seafloor slope. By averaging the microplastic mass per cm^{3}, they estimated that Earth's seafloor contains ~14 million tons of microplastic – about double the amount they estimated based on data from earlier studies – despite calling both estimates "conservative" as coastal areas are known to contain much more microplastic. These estimates are about one to two times the amount of plastic thought – per Jambeck et al., 2015 – to currently enter the oceans annually.	[Plastics pollution] [Oceans]	
October 7	Analysis, Visualization	Scientists of the Global Carbon Project publish a comprehensive quantification of global sources and sinks of the greenhouse gas nitrous oxide, N_{2}O and report that human-induced emissions increased by 30% over the past four decades and is the main cause of the increase in atmospheric concentrations, with recent growth exceeding some of the highest projected emission scenarios.	[Nitrous oxide emissions]	
October 14	Analysis, Assessment	Researchers develop and apply a multicriteria optimization to prioritize areas for restoration. Their estimated cost-benefit ratio is based on contemporary assignments of value for labor, material input, and yield losses – such as of beef – on the costs-side and biodiversity conservation, local nature benefits, poverty-reduction, and climate-stabilization on the benefits-side. Restoration of degraded terrestrial ecosystems is shown to be 13 times more effective when applied in the highest priority locations, with major improvements in terms of biodiversity, climate and food security goals, at low cost. They note that gains are highest when restoration is combined with protection of remaining ecosystems.	[Restoration] [Map]	
October 14	Observation, Analysis	A study reports major shifts in the colony size structure – the demographics – of the Great Barrier Reef's coral populations compared to 1995/1996. The reef is known to have lost more than half of its overall coral cover since then.	[Coral bleaching]	
October 14	Observation, Analysis	Scientists report, based on near-real-time activity data, an 'unprecedented' abrupt 8.8% decrease in global CO_{2} emissions in the first half of 2020 compared to the same period in 2019, larger than during previous economic downturns and World War II. Authors note that such decreases of human activities "cannot be the answer" and that structural and transformational changes in human economic management and behaviour systems are needed.	[COVID-19] [Carbon emissions]	
November 6	Analysis	Scientists report that reducing emissions from the global food system is critical to achieving the Paris Agreement's climate goals.	[Food] [Global warming]	
November 12	Development	Scientists report the development of a microalgae-based fish-free aquaculture feed with substantial gains in sustainability, performance, economic viability, and human health.	[Seafood]	
November 23	Analysis, Attribution	Scientists publish an analysis of how the COVID-19 pandemic has affected US fisheries and seafood consumption. Imports and exports of fresh seafood dropped around 40% early during the pandemic. Restaurant demand for seafood also declined whereas seafood takeout and delivery increased.	[Seafood]	
November 25	Development	Scientists report the development of micro-droplets for algal cells or synergistic algal-bacterial multicellular spheroid microbial reactors capable of producing oxygen as well as hydrogen via photosynthesis in daylight under air, which may be useful as a hydrogen economy biotechnology.	[Hydrogen]	
December 1	Development	The Chinese experimental nuclear fusion reactor HL-2M is turned on for the first time, achieving its first plasma discharge.	[nuclear fusion]	
December 2	Statistics / records	The World Meteorological Organization reports that 2020 is likely among the three warmest years on record globally, at 1.2 °C above the pre-industrial level. The ten years from 2011 to 2020 are also reported to be the warmest decade on record.	[global warming]	
December 2	Observation	Scientists report finding microplastics in the placentas of women with unborn babies for the first time. These may have negative effects on the foetus development.	[microplastic pollution]	
December 2	Development	The world's first regulatory approval for a cultivated meat product is awarded by the Government of Singapore. The chicken meat was grown in a bioreactor in a fluid of amino acids, sugar, and salt. The chicken nuggets food products are ~70% lab-grown meat, while the remainder is made from mung bean proteins and other ingredients. The company pledged to strive for price parity with premium "restaurant" chicken servings.	[food] [cultivated meat]	
December 15	Analysis	An analysis of external climate costs of foods indicates that external greenhouse gas costs are typically highest for animal-based products – conventional and organic to about the same extent within that ecosystem subdomain – followed by conventional dairy products and lowest for organic plant-based foods and concludes contemporary monetary evaluations to be "inadequate" and policy-making that lead to reductions of these costs to be possible, appropriate and urgent.	[food] [global warming]	
December 18	Observation	Ecologists report that the driest and warmest sites of 32 tracked Brazilian non-Amazon tropical forests have moved from carbon sinks to carbon sources ~2013.	[Tropical forest] [Global warming]	
December 21	Projections / assessment	Researchers publish projections and models of potential impacts of policy-dependent modulation of how, where, and what food is produced.	[food]	

==== Geosciences, biotechnology, anthropology and geoengineering ====
Date / period	Type	Description	Topics	Image
April 1	Paleoclimatology, Paleontology	Researchers report to have discovered and analysed fossil roots embedded in a mudstone matrix containing diverse pollen and spores which indicate that rainforests existed near the South Pole ca. 90 million years ago during the Cretaceous period. Their findings suggest that the climate was exceptionally warm at the time and that the carbon dioxide levels in the atmosphere were substantially higher than expected during the mid-Cretaceous period, 115-80 million years ago.	[Global warming]	
April 20	Paleontology, Mechanics	Researchers report that Eurasian ice sheet collapse was a major source meltwater pulse 1A sea level rise 14,600 years ago, causing up to half of the ca. 16 meter rise.	[Sea level rise]	
July 8	Geo-engineering, Assessment	Scientists assess that the geoengineering technique of enhanced rock weathering – spreading finely crushed basalt on fields – has potential use for carbon dioxide removal by nations, identifying costs, opportunities and engineering challenges.	[Global warming]	
August 26	Paleoclimatology	Scientists report that the average global temperature of the last ice age, or Last Glacial Maximum, was ~6.1 °C cooler than today and that the equilibrium climate sensitivity was 3.4 °C, consistent with the established consensus range of 2–4.5 °C.	[Ice age] [Equilibrium climate sensitivity] [Temperature records]	
September 11	Paleoclimatology, Data-integration, Analysis	Scientists publish a continuous, high-fidelity record of variations in Earth's climate during the past 66 million years and identify four climate states, separated by transitions that include changing greenhouse gas levels and polar ice sheets volumes.	[Global warming] [Climate change] [Equilibrium climate sensitivity]	
September 28	Biotechnology	Biotechnologists report the genetically engineered refinement and mechanical description of synergistic enzymes – PETase, first discovered in 2016, and MHETase of Ideonella sakaiensis – for faster depolymerization of PET as well as of PEF, which may be useful for depollution, recycling and upcycling of mixed plastics.	[Plastics pollution] [recycling]	
October 15	Anthropology	Researchers report that two Homo species lost more than half of their climate niche space just before extinction and that climate change played a substantial role in extinctions of past Homo species.	[Climate change]	
October 19	Paleontology	Scientists reconstruct the mechanisms, integrating them in a biogeochemical model, that lead to the Permian–Triassic extinction event 252 Mya, and report that it can be traced back to volcanic CO_{2} emissions.	[Climate change] [Volcanoes]	
November 4	Paleontology	Further evidence – based on paired coronene-mercury spikes – for a volcanic combustion cause of the largest known mass extinction of life 252 Mya is published.	[Climate change] [Volcanoes]	
December 11	Simulation	A supercomputer simulation of planetary climate feedbacks vaguely suggests that chance – in terms of likeliness after known initial conditions – played a substantial role in Earth's thermal habitability lasting over 3 bn years.	[Planetary science]	

== COVID-19 pandemic ==
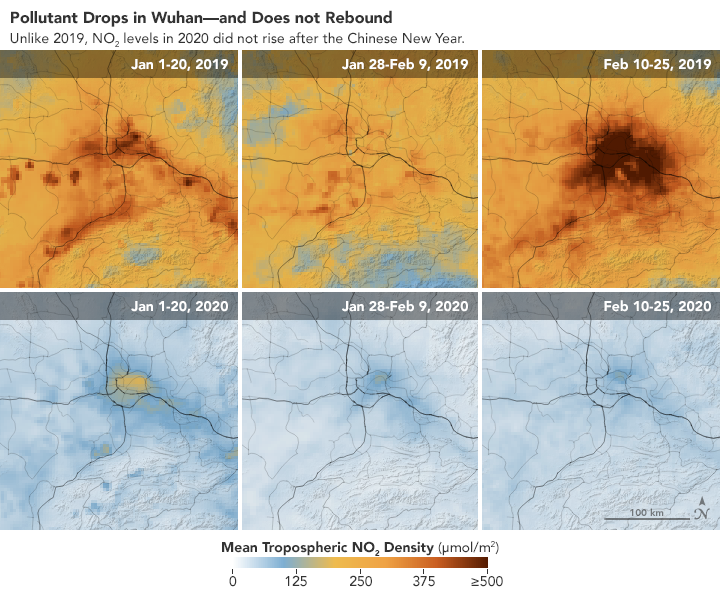
Images from the NASA Earth Observatory show a stark drop in pollution in Wuhan, when comparing NO_{2} levels in early 2019 (top) and early 2020 (bottom).

In February - March 2020 campaigners say that governments should act with the same urgency on climate as on the coronavirus. The health crisis is reducing carbon emissions more than any policy.

- Global air traffic decreased by 4.3% in February 2020 with cancellations of tens of thousands of flights to affected areas.
- Chinese measures against coronavirus in Feb 2020 reduced coal consumption at power plants 36%, oil refining capacity 34% and satellite-based NO2 levels 37%.
- US seafood imports and exports for fresh products dropped during the pandemic while frozen products were less affected. Demand for seafood at restaurants also dropped but there were increases in seafood delivery and takeout.

For further information see the tag [COVID-19] above.

== International goals ==
A list of − mostly self-imposed and legally voluntary or unenforceable − goals due by 2020 as decided by multinational corporate associations and international governance entities and their status:

Entity	Agreement	Goal	Status
European Union	Amsterdam Call for Action on Open Science	All published scientific papers publicly funded by E.U. member states should be made free to access by 2020	Not achieved
Paris Agreement	Paris Agreement	Developed countries reaffirmed the commitment to mobilize $100 billion a year in climate finance by 2020, and agreed to continue mobilizing finance at the level of $100 billion a year until 2025.	
United Nations	Aichi Biodiversity Targets	Goals to reduce pressures on biodiversity, restore ecosystems and sustainable use of biological resources, agreed to by almost 200 governments at a 2010 UN Convention on Biological Diversity	Not achieved (6 partially of 20)
80 brands	"Detox challenge"	A campaign that challenges big clothing brands from all sectors to voluntarily reform their manufacturing supply chains to commit to achieve zero discharges of hazardous chemicals by 2020	Unclear/not achieved
United Nations	SDG 2.5		
United Nations	SDG 3.6		Unclear/not achieved
United Nations	SDG 4b		Unclear
United Nations	SDG 6.6		Unclear
United Nations	SDG 9c		Not achieved
United Nations	SDG 11.b		Unclear
United Nations	SDG 12.4	"achieve the environmentally sound management of chemicals and all wastes throughout their life cycle, in accordance with agreed international frameworks, and significantly reduce their release to air, water and soil in order to minimize their adverse impacts on human health and the environment"	Unclear
United Nations	SDG 13.a		
United Nations	SDG 14.2		
United Nations	SDG 14.4		
United Nations	SDG 14.5		
United Nations	SDG 14.6		
United Nations	SDG 15.1		
United Nations	SDG 15.2		
United Nations	SDG 15.5		
United Nations	SDG 15.8		
United Nations	SDG 15.9		
United Nations	SDG 17.18		

== See also ==
- 2020s in environmental history
- 2020 in climate change
- List of large volcanic eruptions in the 21st century
- List of years in the environment
- Energy development
- Timeline of solar cells#2020
- 2020 in space
- Lists of extinct animals#Recent extinction
- Category:Species described in 2020
- Category:Protected areas established in 2020
- Human impact on the environment
- List of environmental issues
- Outline of environmental studies
