= Space for Climate Observatory =

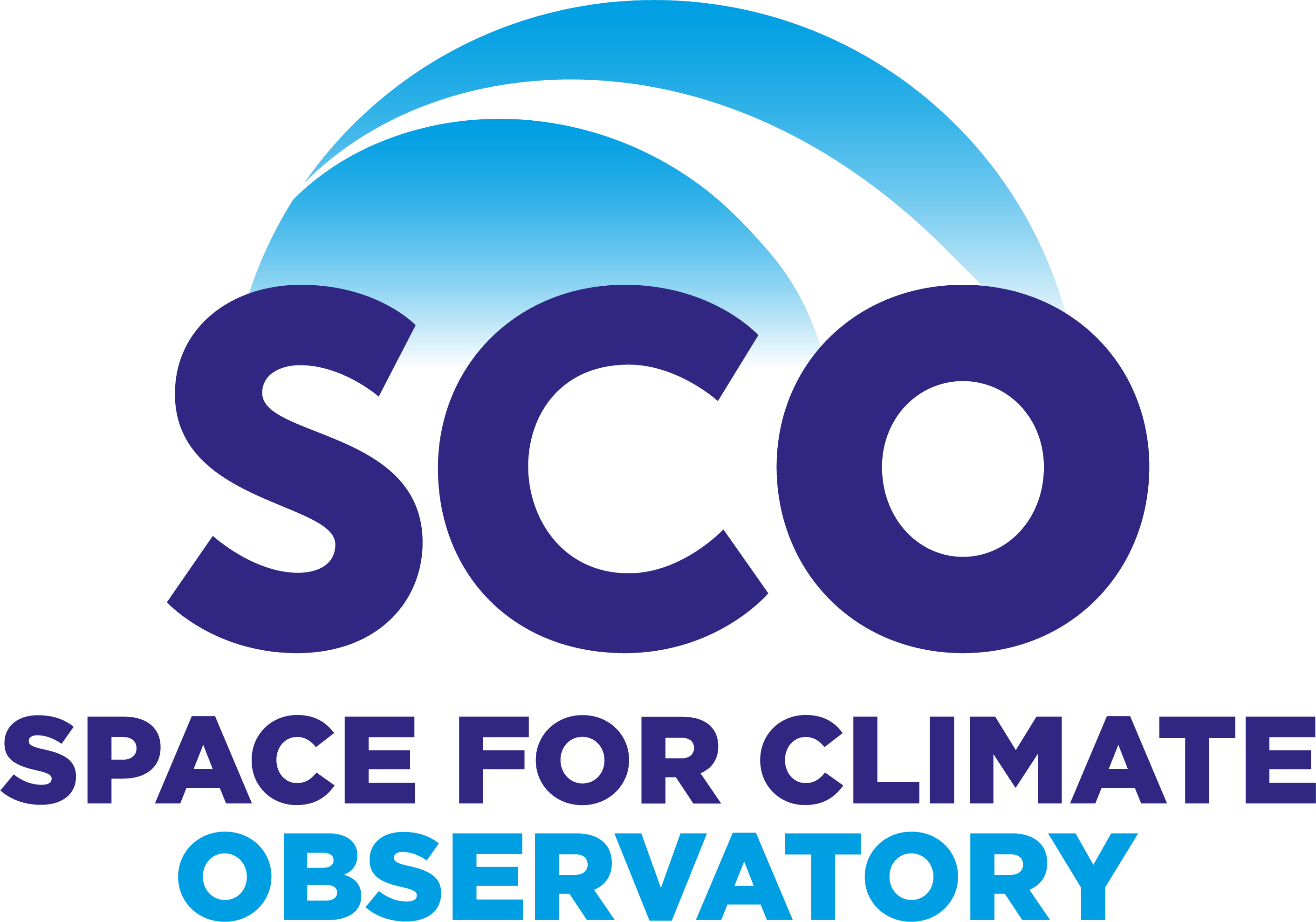
- Formation: June 17, 2019; 7 years ago
- Members: 61 (2025)
- Official language: English
- Website: www.spaceclimateobservatory.org

The Space for Climate Observatory, or SCO, is an international initiative launched in 2019 to combat and adapt to the impacts of climate change using satellite data.

Bringing together a range of public and private entities involved in the Earth observation sector, the SCO brings together and coordinates efforts to develop operational tools aimed at political decision-makers and the general public for monitoring, mitigating and adapting to the impacts of climate change at local level.

== History ==
=== Context and issues ===
The work of the IPCC establishes that human activity is responsible for the climate change observed by scientists. Higher temperatures, more frequent extreme weather events, rising sea levels and melting ice are some of the most visible signs, confirmed by space-based observations of essential climate variables (ECVs). Again according to the IPCC reports, the predicted increasing changes will have a cascade of consequences: severe weather phenomena, the effects of extreme heat, problems with water and food supplies, degradation of the environment and quality of life, increased air pollution, impacts on water quality, health problems, increased social inequalities, fires, drought, and so on.

As international efforts focus heavily on mitigating climate change, the SCO concentrates on adapting territories to the effects of climate change by providing tools and support for decision-making at local/regional/national level. To achieve this, the projects developed by the SCO mobilise spatial, in situ and socio-economic data to provide local decision-makers with tools for forecasting, analysing and monitoring the impacts of climate change in a wide range of areas, such as retreating coastlines, urban heat islands, water management, agriculture, flooding and extreme weather events, etc.

=== Preparation, from 2015 to 2019 ===
In September 2015, at the summit of heads of space agencies organised by the International Academy of Astronautics in Mexico, a declaration affirmed the need to strengthen international cooperation and take full advantage of Earth observation satellites to observe climate change and monitor the commitments made to mitigate its effects.

On 12 December 2015 at COP21, 195 countries signed the Paris Agreement to contain, by 2100, the rise in global temperature to well below 2 °C, and if possible below 1.5 °C compared to pre-industrial levels. In 2016, space agencies from around the world ratified the New Delhi and Marrakech declarations to develop a common system for measuring greenhouse gas concentrations and one for the water cycle.

On 11 December 2017, 25 of them initialled the Paris Declaration in favour of a Space Climate Observatory. The creation of the SCO was ratified the following day at the "One Planet Summit", a progress report on the implementation of the Paris Agreement organised by France. A first demonstrator was presented at the Toulouse Space Show on 28 June 2018.

=== Birth and growth ===
After an initial coordination meeting in February 2019, on 17 June 2019, 22 space agencies and international organisations sign the Joint Declaration of Interest for the SCO at the Paris-Le Bourget International Air Show (France). The first International Steering Committee meeting will be held on 22 October 2019, in conjunction with the 70th International Astronautical Congress (IAC) in Washington (USA).

As the instigator of the initiative, France is launching the first call for SCO projects in September 2019 and will label the first 20 projects in March 2020. A number of projects have become emblematic of the SCO approach, such as the TropiSCO platform to monitor tropical deforestation in real time, FLAude and its FORO tool to improve flood resilience, ALEOFEU to prevent the risk of forest fires, EO4Wetlands to renaturalise wetlands, and SCOLive, which uses the olive tree as a bioindicator of climate change.

The founding Charter of the SCO, drawn up by all its members under the coordination of the United Nations Office for Outer Space Affairs (UNOOSA), will be ratified on 27 June 2022 and will enter into force on 1 September 2022.

== Mission ==
=== General objectives ===
The SCO supports the development of a set of operational tools for policy-makers and the general public, taking full advantage of satellite, in situ and socio-economic data to enable the implementation of policies to mitigate and adapt to the impacts of climate change at local level. These tools, which are co-constructed with their users to respond precisely to local needs, must be easily transferable to other regions facing the same challenges.

The SCO also aims to improve international coordination around operational applications based on space technologies for climate, highlight the tools developed and thus serve as an international forum for these issues.

=== Sustainable development goals ===
As an instrument of international cooperation in the field of climate change impacts, the SCO actively contributes to the 17 Sustainable Development Goals (SDGs) adopted by the United Nations in 2015 (Agenda 2030).

100% of SCO projects meet 2 SDGs:

- SDG13 - Take urgent action to combat climate change and its impacts
- SDG17 - Revitalize the global partnership for sustainable development

SCO projects also specifically address the following SDGs:

- SDG6 - Ensure access to water and sanitation for all and ensure sustainable management of water resources
- SDG11 - Make cities inclusive, safe, resilient and sustainable
- SDG15 - Preserve and restore terrestrial ecosystems

== Organization ==
=== Charter and international governance ===
The members of the SCO are signatories to the founding Charter of the Space for Climate Observatory. This Charter defines the scope, activities and governance of the SCO. It also opens its membership to any public or private entity committed to climate action.

As an international initiative based on the best efforts of its members, the SCO has multilateral governance. A Focal Point is appointed in each country to take part in the meetings of the Steering Committee, which meets at least twice a year to decide on the alliance's major orientations. Among these Focal Points, a sub-group forms the Programme Committee, which oversees for a given period the SCO activities - projects and working groups - carried out by each of the members. These committees and all activities are supported by the SCO General Secretariat, under the responsibility of a SCO member.

=== Member states and institutions ===
By 31 December 2025, 61 institutions had signed the SCO Charter.

Country	Organization	Acronym	Date of signature
International	International Society for Photogrammetry and Remote Sensing	ISPRS	07/06/2022
International	United Nations Office for Outer Space Affairs	UNOOSA	27/06/2022
International	United Nations Development Program	UNDP	09/01/2023
International	United Nations Environment Program	UNEP	18/11/2022
International	International Space University	ISU	15/07/2024
Argentina	Comisión Nacional de Actividades Espaciales	CONAE	19/09/2022
Azerbaijan	Azercosmos	Azercosmos	27/06/2022
Bahrain	National Space Science Agency	NSSA	15/10/2024
Belgium	Politique scientifique fédérale belge	BELSPO	27/06/2022
Canada	Canadian Space Agency	CSA	18/09/2023
China	China National Space Administration	CNSA	27/06/2022
Djibouti	Centre d’Études et de Recherche de Djibouti	CERD	11/10/2024
Ethiopia	Space Science and Geospatial Institute	SSGI	27/06/2022
Europe	European Organisation for the Exploitation of Meteorological Satellites	EUMETSAT	24/10/2023
Europe	European Space Agency	ESA	27/06/2022
France	ACRI-ST	ACRI-ST	19/11/2025
France	Agence française de la Transition écologique	ADEME	30/05/2023
France	Agence Française du Développement	AFD	27/06/2022
France	Bureau de recherches géologiques et minières	BRGM	20/03/2025
France	Centre d'études et d'expertise sur les risques, l'environnement, la mobilité et l'aménagement	CEREMA	27/06/2022
France	Centre de coopération internationale en recherche agronomique pour le développement	CIRAD	01/09/2022
France	Centre national de la recherche scientifique	CNRS	27/06/2022
France	Centre Scientifique et Technique du Bâtiment	CSTB	28/03/2023
France	Expertise France	Expertise France	04/12/2023
France	Global Earth Observations	GlobEO	19/11/2025
France	Institut du développement durable et des relations internationales	IDDRI	30/05/2023
France	Institut français de recherche pour l’exploitation de la mer	IFREMER	10/07/2025
France	Institut national de l’information géographique et forestière	IGN	27/06/2022
France	Institut national de l'environnement industriel et des risques	INERIS	20/03/2025
France	Institut national de recherche pour l'agriculture, l'alimentation et l'environnement	INRAE	27/06/2022
France	Institut de recherche pour le développement	IRD	23/06/2022
France	Maps Earth Observation Satellite Services	MEOSS	19/11/2025
France	Agence française de météorologie	Météo-France	30/05/2023
France	Office français de la biodiversité	OFB	27/06/2022
France	Office national des forêts	ONF	27/06/2022
France	Service hydrographique et océanographique de la Marine	SHOM	27/06/2022
France	Centre National d'Etudes Spatiales	CNES	06/06/2022
Gabon	Agence Gabonaise d’Études et d’Observations Spatiales	AGEOS	21/06/2022
India	Indian Space Research Organization	ISRO	27/06/2022
Italy	Italian Space Agency	ASI	24/06/2022
Kenya	Kenya Space Agency	KSA	24/06/2025
Malta	Malta Council for Science and Technology	MCST	14/06/2022
Mexico	Mexican space agency	AEM	27/06/2022
Monaco	Monaco Space Office	MSO	20/03/2025
Netherlands	Netherlands Space Office	NSO	23/05/2023
Norway	Norwegian Space Agency	NOSA	23/05/2023
Philippines	Philippine Space Agency	PhilSA	28/11/2022
Portugal	Agência Espacial Portuguesa	Ptspace	27/06/2022
Saudi Arabia	Saudi Space Agency	SSA	04/12/2023
Senegal	Agence Sénégalaise d'Études Spatiales	ASES	07/10/2025
Singapore	Office for Space Technology and Industry	OSTIn	23/06/2022
Slovakia	Slovak Space Office - Industry Branch	SSO-SARIO	21/06/2022
South Africa	South African National Space Agency	SANSA	06/11/2023
Spain	Institut d’Estudis Espacials de Catalunya	IECC	16/12/2025
Sweden	Swedish National Space Agency	SNSA	27/06/2022
Thailand	Geo-Informatics and Space Technology Development Agency	GISTDA	17/06/2022
United Arab Emirates	Mohammed Bin Rashid Space Centre	MBRSC	02/06/2023
United Arab Emirates	UAE Space Agency	UAESA	05/12/2022
United Kingdom	UK Space Agency	UKSA	27/06/2022
USA	National Oceanic and Atmospheric Administration	NOAA	07/06/2022
Vietnam	Vietnam Academy of Science and Technology	VAST	24/09/2025

=== National SCOs ===
- SCO in South-Africa
- SCO in China
- SCO in France
- SCO in Gabon
- SCO in Norway
- SCO in Slovakia
- SCO in Sweden
- SCO in the United-Kingdom

== Functioning by use case ==
=== National SCO and calls for projects ===
The signatories of the SCO Charter aim to identify and support local projects that respond to the concrete needs of the area.

These projects are selected through an annual call for projects. As the instigator of the international initiative, France has devised a modus operandi which can be replicated by each national SCO.

At international level, knowledge sharing and synergies between projects are organised to encourage the scaling up of the solutions developed. International cooperation is also provided to help the most vulnerable regions.

=== SCO project criteria ===
Projects applying for the SCO label must meet a number of criteria, in particular:

- Meet the needs of end-users in a specific geographical area;
- Constitute a multi-family consortium comprising at least scientists, companies and/or public authorities and the end user;
- Propose an operational and practical solution, such as an application or web mapping interface, preferably open source;
- Make the most of satellite, environmental and climate data, combining them with available in situ and socio-economic data;
- Draw on existing (pre-)operational and research infrastructures, services and local data;
- Can be extended or transposed to other geographical areas.

=== Community feedback ===
Ideally, the solutions developed via the SCO should be able to be transposed to other locations, to benefit as many people as possible. In this context, the projects awarded the label undertake to share all or part of the data, algorithms and technical components. Bilateral or multilateral collaborations, or collaborations involving other SCO signatories, are encouraged.
