= Cloud formation and climate change =

Study of clouds and cloud formation

Nephology (/nɪˈfɒlədʒi/; from the Greek word nephos for 'cloud') is the study of clouds and cloud formation. British meteorologist Luke Howard was a major researcher within this field, establishing a cloud classification system.

While this branch of meteorology still exists today, the term nephology, or nephologist is rarely used. The term came into use at the end of the nineteenth century, and fell out of common use by the middle of the twentieth.

Recently, interest in nephology has increased as some meteorologists have begun to focus on the relationship between clouds and global warming, which is a source of uncertainty regarding "estimates and interpretations of the Earth's changing energy budget." Since the late 1990s, some have suggested that when high solar activity lowers levels of cosmic rays, that in turn reduces cloud cover and warms the planet. Others say that there is no statistical evidence for such an effect.

Some nephologists believe that an increase in global temperature could decrease the thickness and brightness (ability to reflect light energy), which would further increase global temperature.
