= Global Forest Resources Assessment =

Global Forest Resources Assessment (FRA)
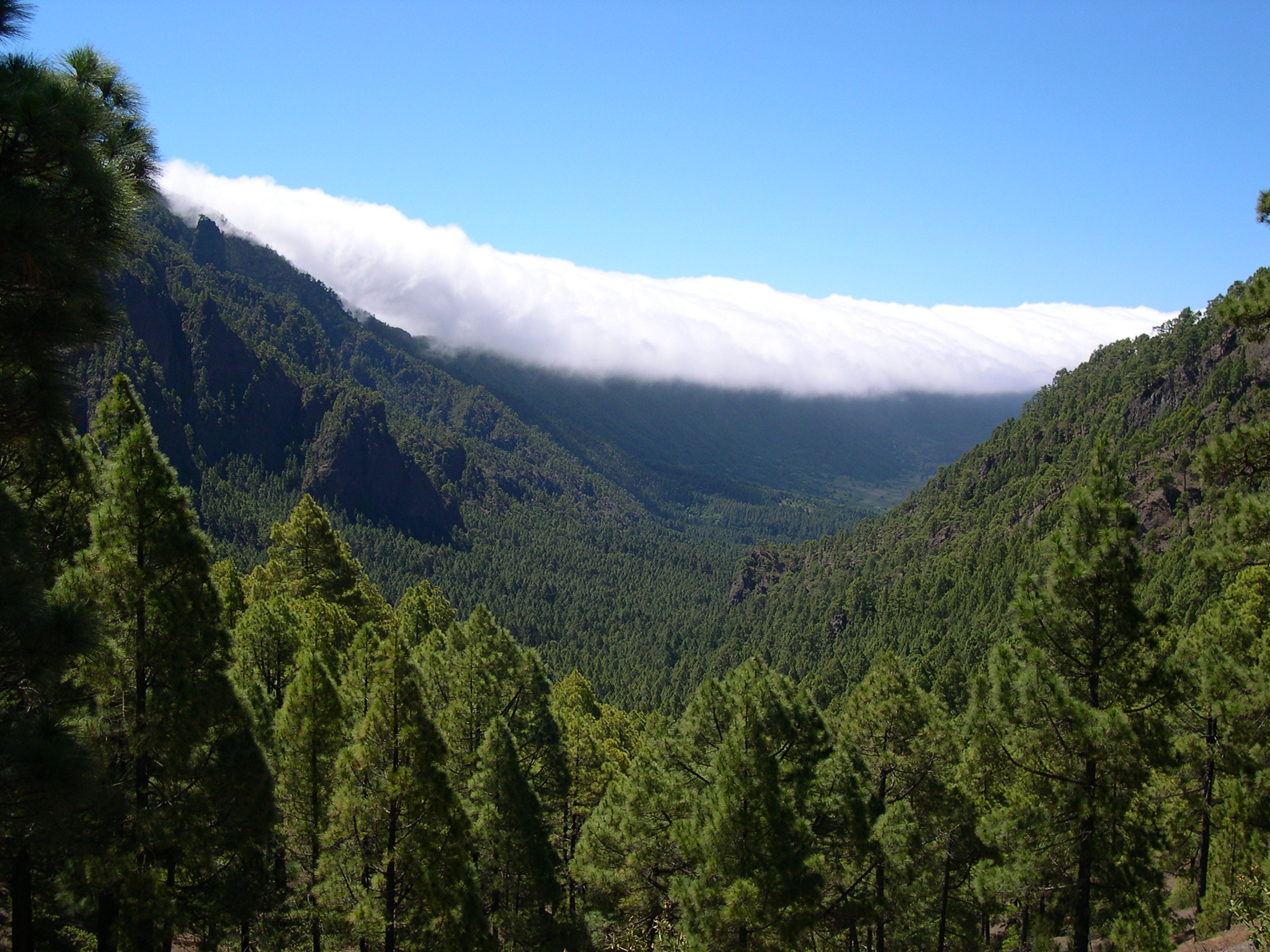
- Formation: 1948
- Headquarters: Rome, Italy
- Parent Organization: Food and Agriculture Organization
- Website: fao.org/fra

The Global Forest Resources Assessment (FRA) reports on the status and trends of the world's forest resources. It is led by the Food and Agriculture Organization of the United Nations (FAO).

FRA reports the extent of the world's forest area as well as other variables, including forest growing stock, biomass and carbon, forest designation and management, forest ownership and management rights, forest disturbances, forest policy and legislation, employment education, and non-timber forest production.

== Background ==
FAO's Global Forest Resources Assessments provide a comprehensive view of the world's forests and the ways in which they are changing. FRA data and analyses support the development of sound policies, practices and investments affecting forests and forestry around the world.

=== History ===
FAO's mandate to assess the world's forest resources stems from its constitution, "The Organization shall collect, analyze, interpret and disseminate information relating to nutrition, food and agriculture. In this Constitution, the term ‘agriculture’ and its derivatives include fisheries, marine products, forestry and primary forestry products" (Article I, Functions of the Organization, paragraph 1).

The first FAO Global Forest Resources Assessment was published in 1948 and focused mostly on assessing the availability of timber. Since then, FAO has been monitoring the world's forests at five- to ten-year intervals, and has produced various regional and global surveys.

== Data collection process ==
The assessment is based on two primary sources of data: country reports prepared by national correspondents and remote sensing that are compiled in cooperation with a network of national experts and international partners such as the Joint Research Centre of the European Commission (JRC).

=== Country reporting ===
FRA is a country-driven process where official national data are reported to FAO by country officers known as national correspondents. National correspondents are officially nominated by their countries to compile and report information and data on their national forest resources. FAO trains the national correspondents on how to compile country reports using commonly agreed-upon terms and definitions and a standardized reporting methodology.

For the FRA 2020, FAO developed the FRA Platform, an online reporting platform where national correspondents add statistical data and metadata on their country's forests and their management and use. The FRA Platform acts as both a reporting platform and a data storage site. It also provides countries that do not have forestry inventory and monitoring systems a tool to consistently interpolate or extrapolate forestry figures.

FAO notes that information generated through a National forest monitoring system can contribute to periodic forest assessments such as the Global Forest Resources Assessment. Studies using FRA reporting have also assessed changes in national forest monitoring capacities over time.

=== Remote sensing ===
Since 1990, FRA has used remote sensing to complement the information collected through the country reporting process with global and regional analyses of the world's forest resources. With better access to a growing archive of satellite imagery and the availability of new tools to facilitate image processing and interpretation, remote sensing has become an important tool for the assessment of the status and changes in tree cover and land use. FRA uses remote sensing surveys to build country capacities to use remote sensing for forest monitoring as well as to generate independent, robust and consistent estimates of forest area and its changes over time at global, regional and biome levels.

== Definitions ==
=== Land use ===
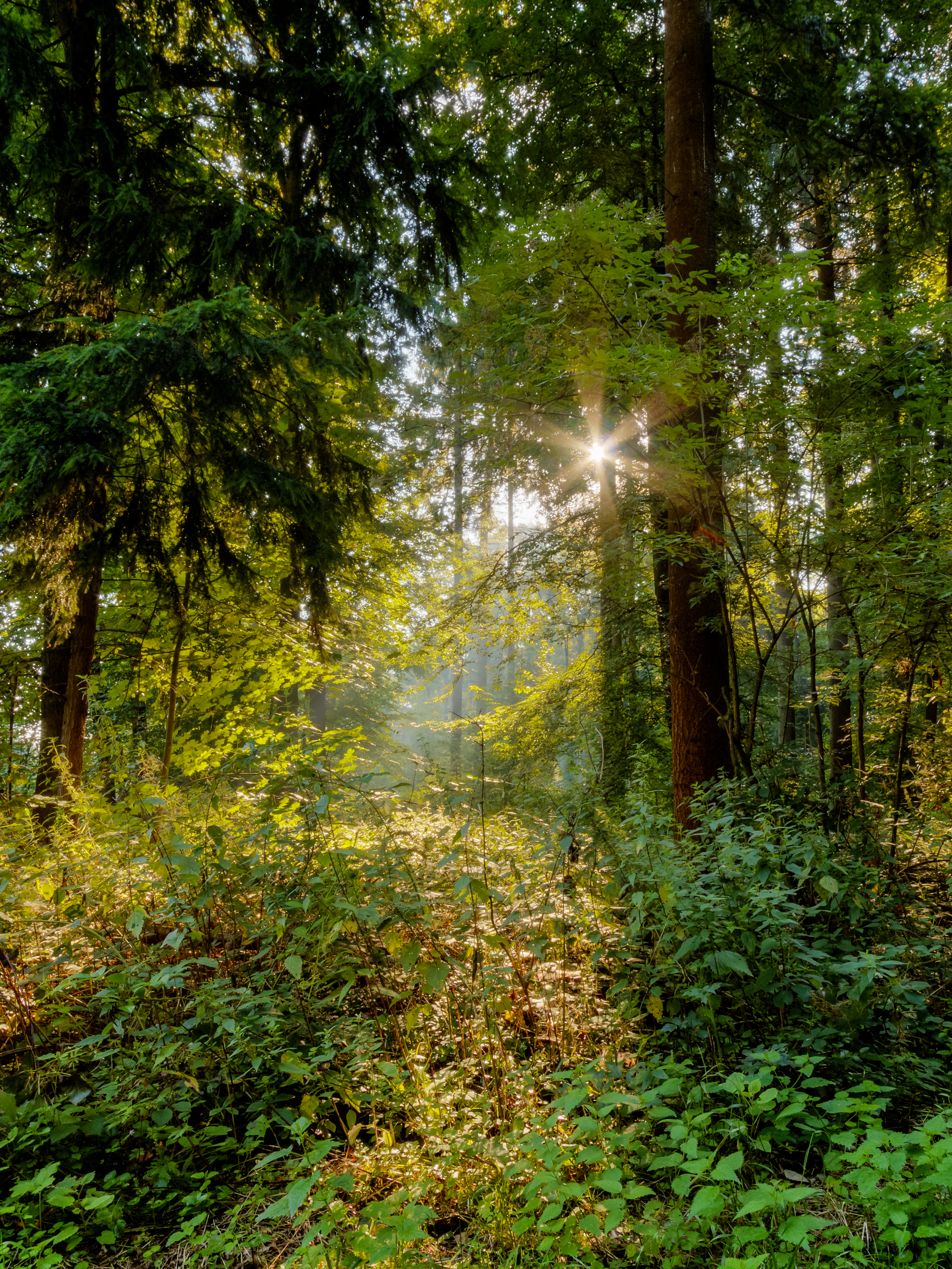
Forest

==== Forest ====
The FAO definition of a forest is, "Land spanning more than 0.5 hectares with trees higher than 5 meters and a canopy cover of more than 10 percent, or trees able to reach these thresholds in situ. It does not include land that is predominantly under agricultural or urban land use."

The definition excludes tree stands in agricultural production systems, such as fruit tree plantations, oil palm plantations, olive orchards, and agroforestry systems when crops are grown under tree cover.

==== Other wooded land ====
The FAO definition of other wooded land is, "Land not classified as 'Forest', spanning more than 0.5 hectares; with trees higher than 5 meters and a canopy cover of 5-10 percent, or trees able to reach these thresholds in situ; or with a combined cover of shrubs, bushes and trees above 10 percent. It does not include land that is predominantly under agricultural or urban land use."

==== Other land ====
The FAO definition of other land is, "All land that is not classified as 'Forest' or 'Other wooded land'."

For the purpose of reporting to FRA, the “Other land” is calculated by subtracting the area of forest and other wooded land from the total land area (as maintained by FAOSTAT). Includes agricultural land, meadows and pastures, built-up areas, barren land, land under permanent ice, etc.

=== Forest area changes ===
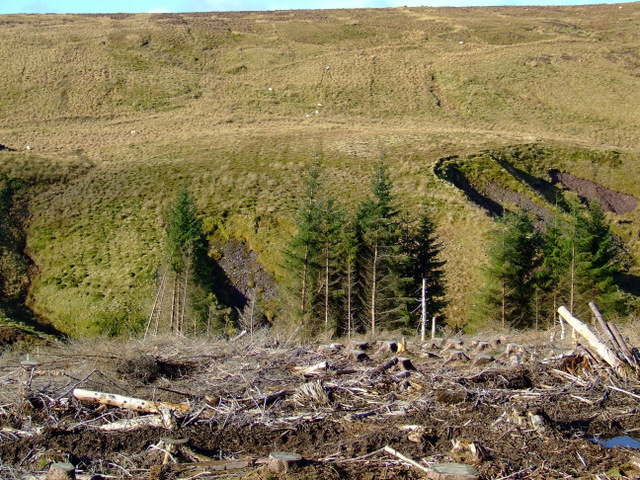
Deforestation

==== Deforestation ====
The FAO definition of deforestation is, "The conversion of forest to other land use independent of whether it is human-induced or not."

It includes permanent reduction of the tree canopy cover below the minimum 10 percent threshold. It includes areas of forest converted to agriculture, pasture, water reservoirs, mining and urban areas. The term specifically excludes areas where the trees have been removed as a result of harvesting or logging, and where the forest is expected to regenerate naturally or with the aid of silvicultural measures. The term also includes areas where, for example, the impact of disturbance, over-utilization or changing environment.

==== Forest expansion ====
The FAO definition of forest expansion is, "Expansion of forest on land that, until then, was under a different land use, implies a transformation of land use from non-forest to forest."

==== Forest net area change ====
The FAO definition of forest area net change is, "the difference in forest area between two FRA reference years. The net change can be either positive (gain), negative (loss) or zero (no change)."

== FRA data ==
FRA 2020 included data from 236 countries and territories. Of the 236 countries and territories, 189 self-reported their own forestry data through the online FRA Platform. The FRA team conducted desk studies for the remaining 47 countries. The 47 countries represented 0.5 percent of the total forest area.

FRA data is grouped according to regions and subregions. The regional groupings of FRA data are: North and Central America (North America, Central America, Caribbean), South America, Europe, Africa (Northern Africa, Western and Central Africa, Eastern and Southern Africa), Asia (Western and Central Asia, South and Southeast Asia, East Asia), and Oceania.

=== Reporting content ===
The latest FRA collected data on over 60 broad variable categories including:

==== Forest extent and changes ====
- Forest area
- Other land with tree cover
- Other wooded land

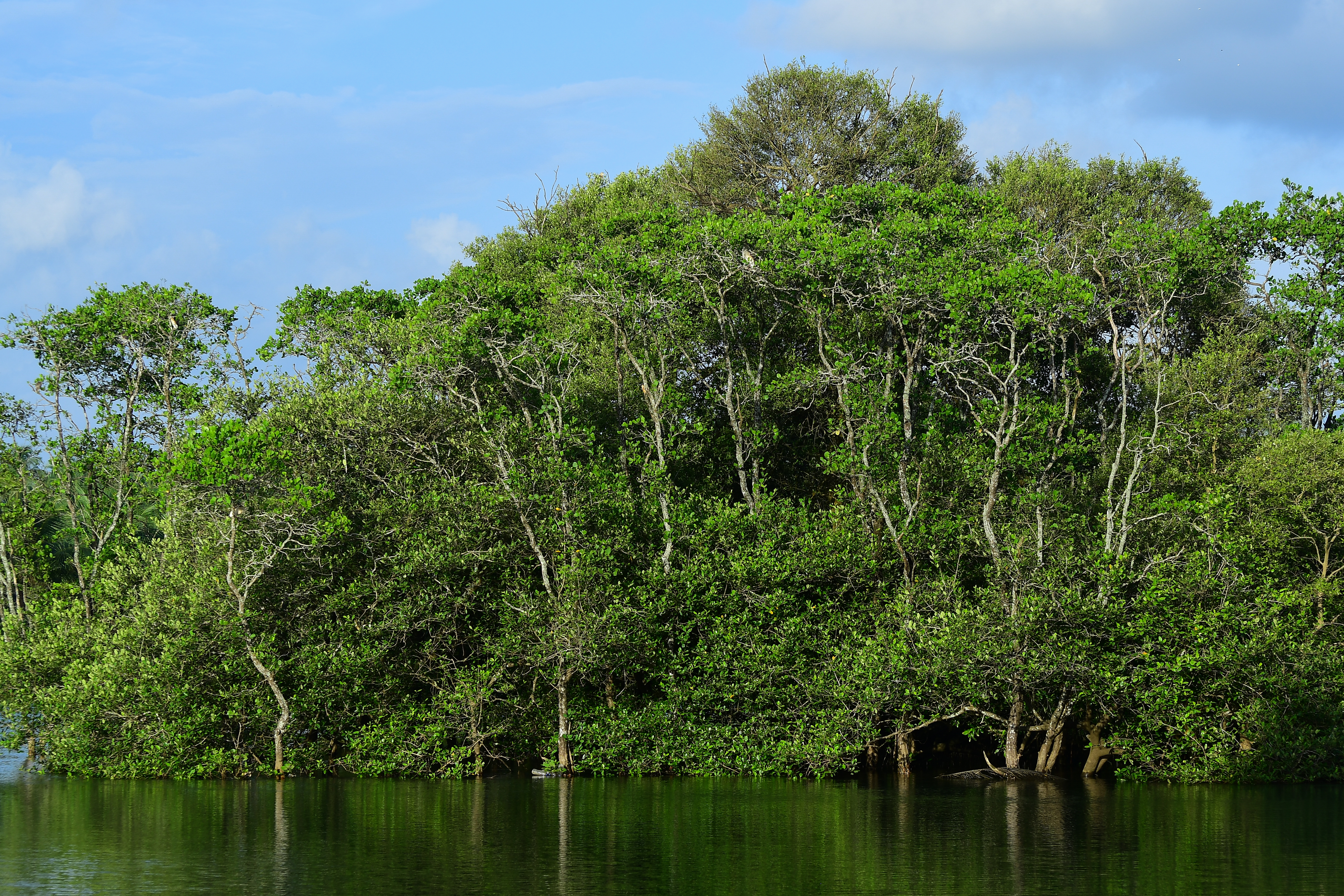
Mangroves

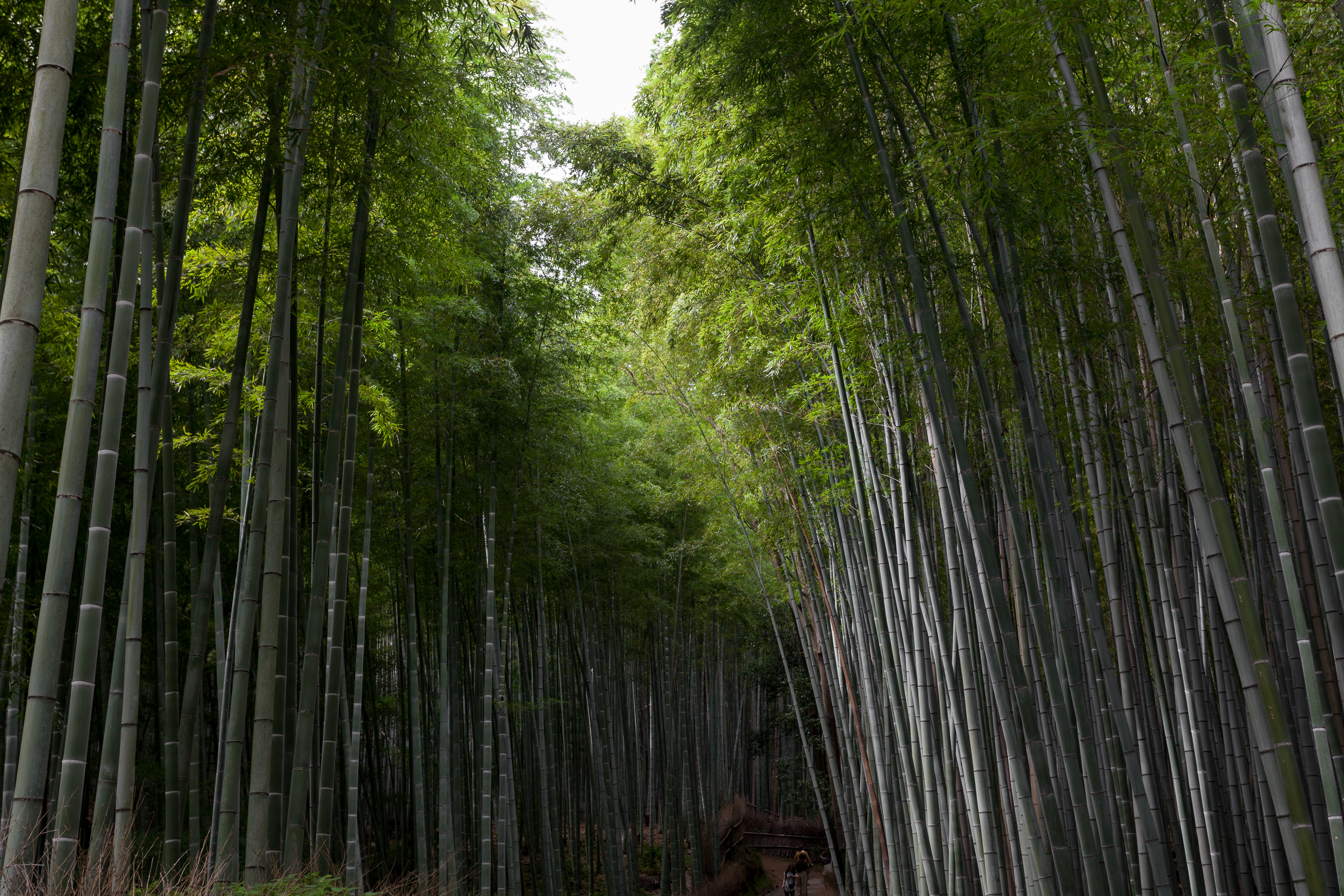
Bamboo

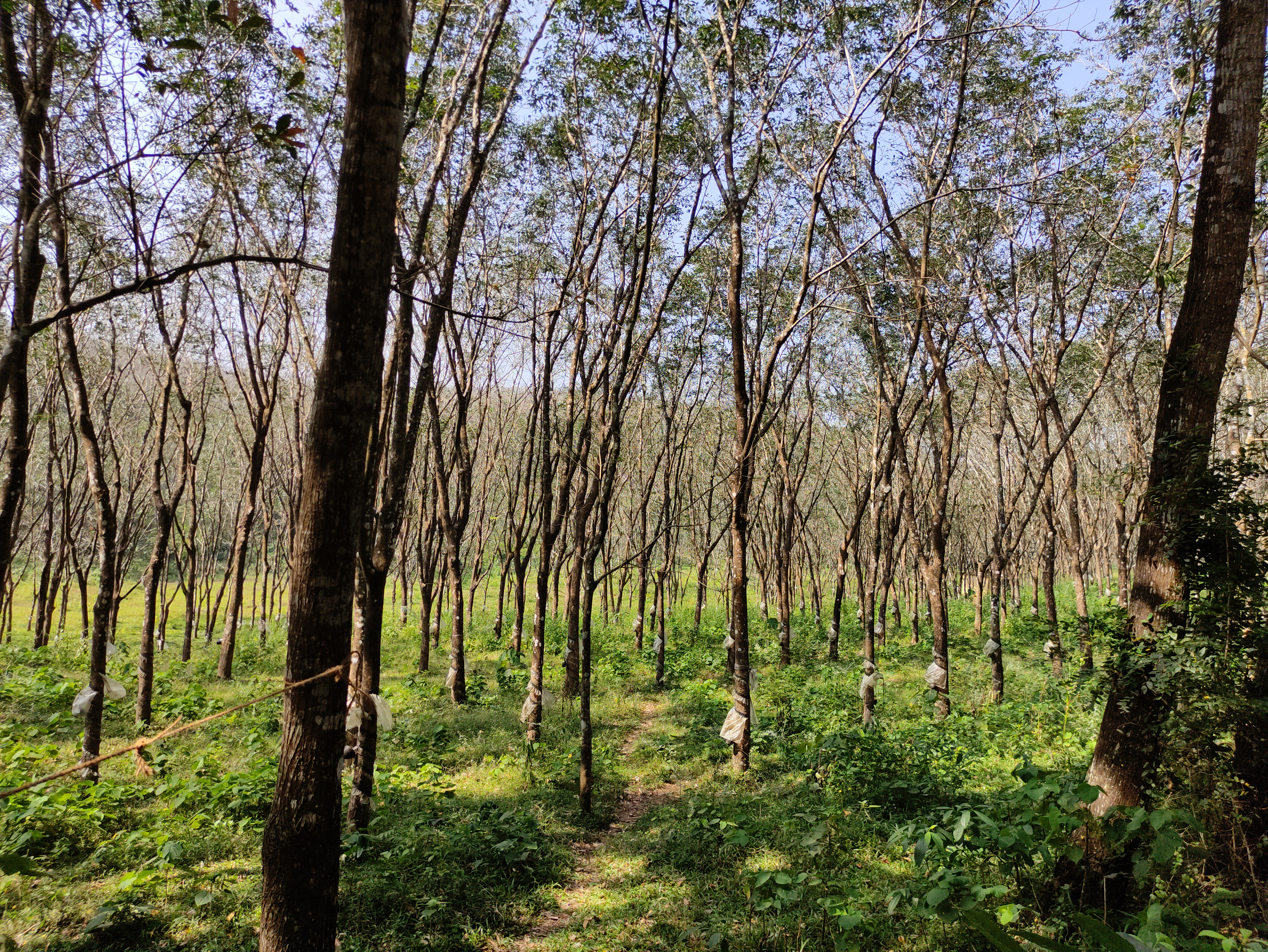
Rubber plantation, Kerala, India

==== Forest characteristics ====
- Naturally regenerating forest
- Planted forest
- Plantation forest and other planted forest
- Plantations of introduced species
- Primary forest
- Mangroves
- Bamboo
- Rubber plantations

==== Growing stock biomass and carbon ====
- Growing stock
- Growing-stock composition
- Biomass stock
- Carbon stock

==== Designation and management ====
- Production
- Multiple use
- Protection of soil and water
- Conservation of biodiversity
- Social services
- Other management objectives
- Forest in protected areas
- Forest area with long-term management plans

==== Ownership and management rights ====
- Forest ownership
- Private ownership, by type of owner
- Holders of management rights in publicly owned forests

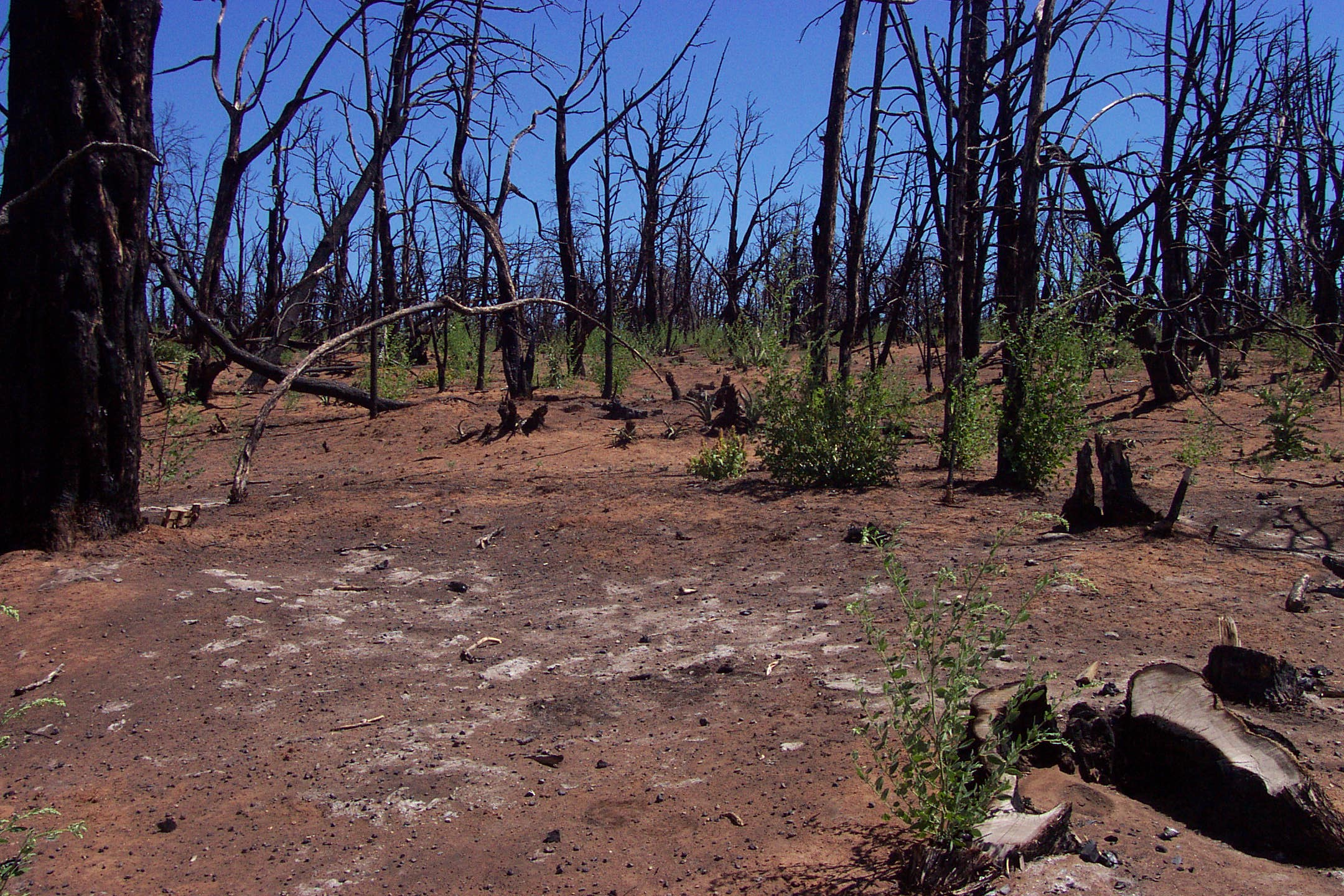
Post forest fire

==== Disturbances ====
- Insects
- Diseases
- Severe weather events
- Fire

=== Desk studies ===
When countries do not nominate national correspondents to prepare country reports, FAO experts write their own reports based on estimated values and statistics and then publish them as desk studies. To collect data for a desk study, FAO experts rely on previously published country reports as well as on other recently published reports and spatial datasets. In some cases, complementary remote sensing-based analysis is implemented as an additional data source.

== Global and regional Forest Resources Assessments ==
=== Latest assessment ===
The most recent assessment, FRA 2020, examined the status of, and trends in, more than 60 forest-related variables in 236 countries and territories in the period 1990–2020. The assessment showed that although the rate of deforestation has slowed, the world's forest area continues to decrease. Key findings include:

- The world has a total forest area of 4.06 billion hectares (ha), which is 31 percent of the total land area.
- The world's forest area is decreasing, but the rate of loss has declined since 1990.
  - Since 1990, the world has lost 178 million ha of forest.
  - The rate of net forest loss decreased substantially over the period 1990–2020 due to a reduction in deforestation in some countries, plus increases in forest area in others through afforestation and the natural expansion of forests.
    - The rate of net forest loss declined from 7.8 million ha per year in the decade 1990–2000 to 5.2 million ha per year in 2000–2010 to 4.7 million ha per year in 2010–2020.
  - Deforestation is the conversion of forest to other land uses, such as agriculture and infrastructure.
    - An estimated 420 million ha of forest has been deforested – converted to other land uses – worldwide since 1990. In the most recent five-year period (2015–2020), the annual rate of deforestation was estimated at 10 million ha, down from 12 million ha in 2010–2015.
- On a regional scale, Africa has the highest annual rate of net forest loss at 3.9 million ha in 2010–2020, followed by South America at 2.6 million ha.
  - While the rate of net forest loss for Africa has increased since 1990, it has declined in South America by about one half between the decades 2000-2010 and 2010–2020.
- On the other hand, Asia had the highest net gain of forest area in 2010–2020 at 1.2 million ha per year, followed by Oceania at 0.4 million ha then Europe at 0.3 million ha.
  - However, both Asia and Europe reported substantially lower rates of net gain in 2010-2020 than in 2000–2010.
- 93 percent of forest area worldwide is composed of naturally regenerating forest while the remaining 7 percent is planted forest.

The next comprehensive FRA report is due in 2025.

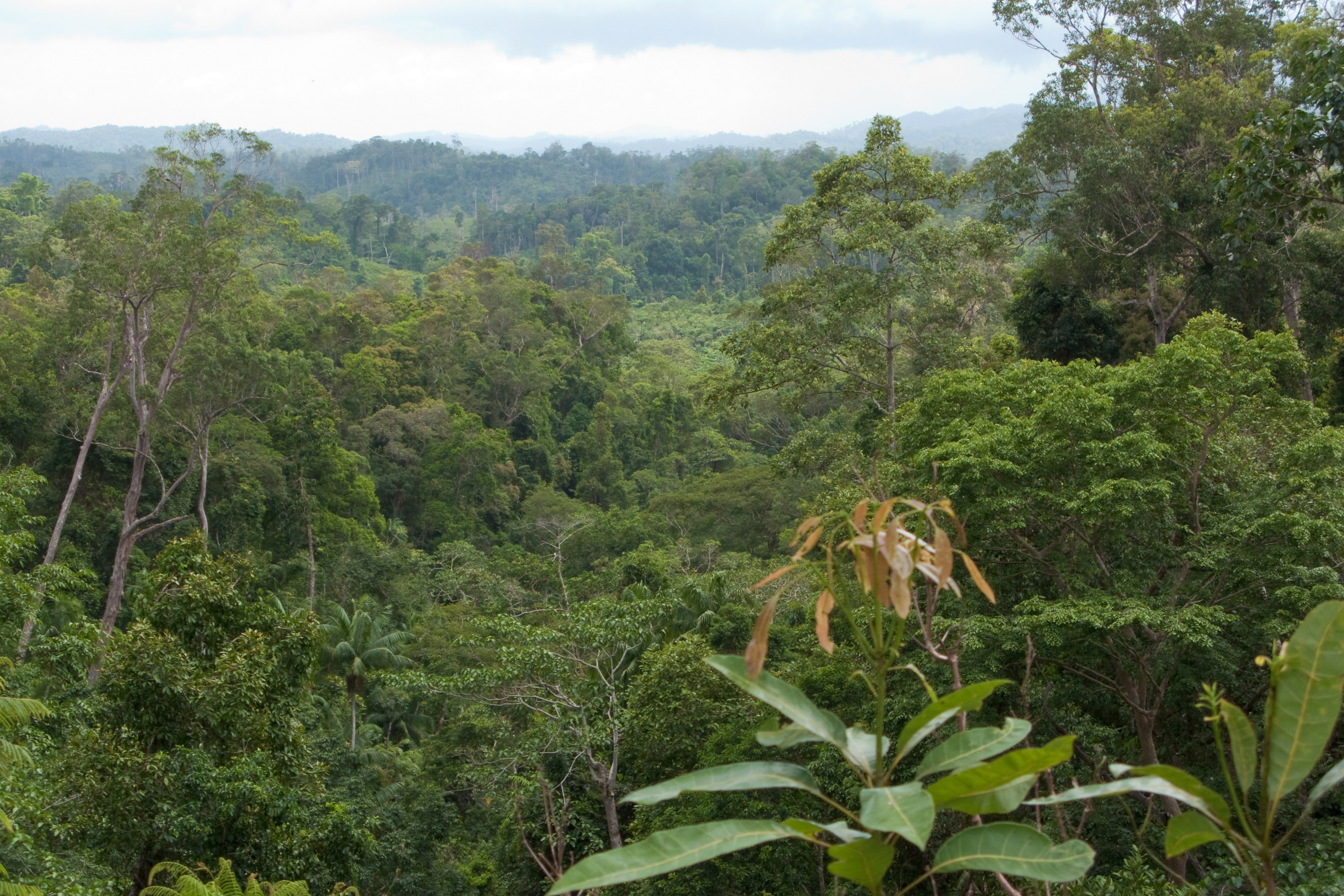
Tropical rainforest, Palawan Island, Philippines

=== Past assessments ===
FAO began publishing forestry assessments in 1948. The first four assessments were published as World Forestry Inventories in 1948, 1953, 1958 and 1963. The reports collected data through questionnaires sent to countries. FRA did not publish any global forestry reports in the 1970s. Instead, FAO conducted regional forest resource assessments that were published in three separate reports. The three reports focused on Europe, Asia and Africa respectively. Since 1980, the reports have become more technical, relying on country analyses by national correspondents, remote sensing and statistical modeling instead of questionnaires. Due to evolving methods, definitions and changes in baseline information, assessments are not comparable. As a result, users should always reference the latest assessment to source information.

== FRA and international forest-related goals and targets ==
=== Millennium Development Goals ===
The Millennium Development Goals consisted of eight international development goals for 2015. Goal 7 of the MDGs was to “ensure environmental sustainability” and part of Target 7B was to “reduce biodiversity loss” in terms of forests. FRA was responsible for reporting the proportion of land area covered by forest to the MDGs.

=== Sustainable Development Goals ===
The Sustainable Development Goals replaced the MDGs in 2015 and are a series of 17 goals to achieve by 2030, to ensure a more sustainable future for all. FRA is responsible for collecting data and reporting on two forest-related SDG indicators. Data submitted to FRA contributes to reporting on Goal 15: Life on Land indicators 15.1.1 forest area as a proportion of total land area and 15.2.1 progress towards sustainable forest management.

=== Global Forest Goals ===
The UN Strategic Plan for Forests 2017 - 2030 features a set of six Global Forest Goals and 26 associated targets to be reached by 2030. One important target is to increase forest area by three percent worldwide by 2030. The Global Forest Goals Report 2021 drew on quantitative and bio-physical data primarily from FRA 2020.
