= 2020 in climate change =

This article documents events, research findings, scientific and technological advances, and human actions to measure, predict, mitigate, and adapt to the effects of global warming and climate change—during the year 2020.

== Summaries ==
- The December 2020 Lancet Countdown review concluded that trends in 2020 showed "a concerning paucity of progress" in numerous sectors, including "a continued failure to reduce the carbon intensity of the global energy system, an increase in the use of coal-fired power, and a rise in agricultural emissions and premature deaths from excess red meat consumption. These issues (were) in part counteracted by the growth of renewable energy and improvements in low-carbon transport." Despite increasing climate suitability for infectious disease transmission and falling crop yield potential, "the global response has remained muted" but "2020 will probably be an inflection point for several of the indicators (to be) presented during the coming decade". The survey further noted that "the nature and extent of the economic impact and response to the COVID-19 pandemic will have a defining role in determining whether the world meets the commitments of the Paris Agreement".

== Measurements and statistics ==
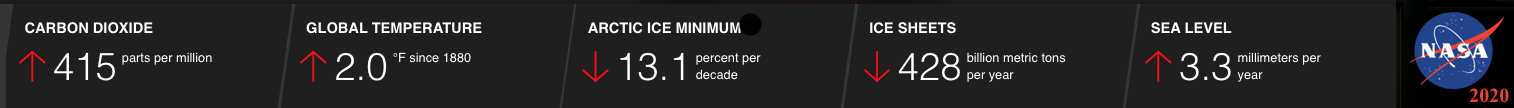
"Vital Signs of the Planet" as presented by NASA on 31 December 2020

- NASA GISS reported 2020's globally averaged temperature was 1.84 °F (1.02 °C) warmer than the baseline 1951-1980 mean, slightly greater than 2016 but within the margin of error of the analysis, making 2020 effectively tie 2016 as the warmest year on record despite La Niña's cooling effect. Independently, Copernicus (EU) concurred with NASA's conclusion, while NOAA and the U.K. Met Office concluded 2020 was the second warmest.
- High northern latitudes:

- Siberia recorded its second warmest January–June temperatures on record—more than 5°C (9°F) above average—including up to 10°C (18°F) above average in June. Verkhoyansk, located north of the arctic circle, recorded a temperature of 38°C (100°F) on 20 June. An analysis showed that, without human-induced climate change, these January–June temperatures would happen less than once in every 80,000 years.
- The fire season in Sakha (Siberia) was unprecedented in the 20-year MODIS record in terms of an earlier start and northern extent, with some fires burning only about 11 km from the Chukchi Sea. From March through June, the burned area was greater than 2.9 times the 20-year mean.
- End-of-winter Arctic sea ice extent was the 11th lowest, and the end-of-summer extent the second-lowest, in the 1979-2020 satellite record.
- April 2020 Northern Hemisphere sea ice volume was approximately 1,000 km^{3} below the 2010-2019 average, and October 2020 sea ice volume showed the lowest value in the preceding 10 years because of a second largest summer loss of 15.215 km^{3}.

NOAA's National Centers for Environmental Information (NCEI) has reported growing numbers of weather and climate-related events costing at least a billion dollars, exceeding the 1980–2019 inflation-adjusted average of 6.6 such events.

- 6 February: in a 1 July 2021 press release, the World Meteorological Organization officially recognized a new record high temperature for the Antarctic continent of 18.3 °C (64.9 °F) reached on 6 February 2020, exceeding the previous high of 17.5 °C (24 March 2015) for the Antarctic region.
- First half of 2020: Ember reported that wind and solar's share of global electricity rose to 9.8%, up from 4.6% at the 2015 signing of the Paris Climate Agreement; also in 2020: Germany (42%), UK (33%), EU (21%), Turkey (13%), US (12%), China, India, Japan, Brazil (each 10%), and Russia (0.2%).
- The September 2020 monthly average CO_{2} concentration at Mauna Loa station was 411.29 ppm (up from 408.54 ppm in September 2019), and at Cape Grim in Tasmania, 410.8 ppm (up from 408.58 ppm in 2019).
- Antarctic ice in 2020 was close to or slightly above the 42-year mean.
- On 16 August, Death Valley reached 54.4 °C (129.9 °F), the highest known temperature in the world in at least the last 80 years.
- On 4 January, Penrith, New South Wales reached 48.9 °C (120 °F), the highest observed temperature in an Australian metropolitan area.
- In the Middle East, temperature records were set in Jerusalem (42.7 °C, 108.8 °F), Eilat (48.9 °C, 120 °F), Kuwait Airport (52.1 °C, 125.8 °F) and Baghdad (51.8 °C, 125.2 °F).
- Ocean heat content (OHC) in the upper 2000 m (6600 ft) reached a record high in 2020 (data collected since 1958), the average annual linear rate increase since 1986 being almost eight times larger than the linear rate from 1958 to 1985.
- NOAA's National Centers for Environmental Information (NCEI) reported (see chart) that in 2020, the U.S. experienced 22 weather and climate-related events costing at least a billion dollars, exceeding the 1980–2019 inflation-adjusted average of 6.6 such events.
- The U.N.'s 2020 Emissions Gap Report stated that the highest-earning 1% of the global population account for more than twice the combined greenhouse gas emissions of the lowest-earning 50%. To meet the 1.5 °C goal of the Paris Agreement, the 1 percent would need to reduce their current emissions by at least a factor of 30, while the per capita emissions of the poorest 50 per cent could increase by around three times their current levels.
- In April 2021, the United Nations Office for Disaster Risk Reduction estimated that in 2020, climate-related disasters were largely responsible for 389 recorded events resulting in 15,080 deaths, 98.4 million people affected, and economic losses of at least US$171.3 billion.
- Reported September 2021: a record 227 environmental activists were killed throughout the world in 2020, with especially high numbers throughout Latin America and the Amazon, most of those killed being small-scale farmers or indigenous people, most defending forests from extractive industries including logging, agribusiness and mining.
- 12 April 2022: a study of 2020 storms of at least tropical storm-strength published in Nature Communications concluded that human-induced climate change increased extreme 3-hourly storm rainfall rates by 10%, and extreme 3-day accumulated rainfall amounts by 5%. For hurricane-strength storms, the figures increased to 11% and 8%.

== Natural events and phenomena ==
- The COVID-19 pandemic:

- As a direct consequence of the pandemic, an 8% reduction in greenhouse gas emissions was projected for 2020, which would be the largest 1-year decline on record. However, this reduction was a result of reduced economic activity, not the decarbonization of the economy required to respond to climate change.
- The Global Carbon Project estimated that global daily CO_{2} emissions may have been reduced by 17% during the most intense periods of COVID-19 shutdowns, but the WMO's Greenhouse Gas Bulletin indicated that this short-term impact cannot cause 2020's annual figure to exceed the 1 ppm natural inter-annual variability.

- Australia bushfires:

- By March 2020, "Black Summer" fires burnt almost 19 million hectares (46.95 million acres), destroyed over 3,000 houses, and killed 33 people and more than a billion animals, and is estimated to have had a A$20 billion impact, exceeding the record A$4.4 billion of 2009's Black Saturday fires.
- A model-based analysis of heat and drought conditions underlying these Australian bushfires found that anthropogenic climate change had caused the probability of extreme heat to increase by at least a factor of two, and the risk of a Fire Weather Index being "severe" or worse to increase by at least 30%.
- Smoke in the stratosphere from the Australian bushfires induced planetary-scale blocking of solar radiation larger than any previously documented wildfires, with the same order of radiative forcing as produced by moderate volcanic eruptions.

- U.S. wildfires: In only seven weeks early in the 2020 Western United States wildfire season, a record 2.7 million hectares (6.7 million acres) burned, leaving tens of thousands homeless.
- The 2020 Atlantic hurricane season included 30 named storms (a record), 14 hurricanes (second highest on record), and record water levels in several locations.
- 11 December: Research published by the American Geophysical Union estimated that at least 23 of 30 magnitude-5+ earthquakes in Alaska since 1770 were worsened by glacial isostatic adjustment, (Note: The 19 March 2021 Forbes article quoted AGU article author Chris Rollins describing how "there are two components to the uplift. There's what's called the 'elastic effect', which is when the earth instantly springs back up after an ice mass is removed. Then there's the prolonged effect from the mantle flowing back upwards under the vacated space.") which is the upward movement of the Earth's crust due to loss of mass of glaciers as they melt.
- In December, Iceberg A-68 approached South Georgia island, retaining an area of 4,200 km^{2} (1,600 mi^{2}) after having calved away much of its mass since it broke off from Antarctica in 2017 as a 5,800 km^{2} (2,200 mi^{2}) iceberg estimated at one trillion tonnes.

== Actions and goal statements ==
=== Science and technology ===
- In October, MOSAiC, the largest-ever ($177 million) Arctic science expedition, completed a nearly 13-month mission, the research vessel Polarstern having been purposely locked in an Arctic ice floe and collecting more than 150 terabytes of data and 1,000 ice samples.
- The Korea Superconducting Tokamak Advanced Research (KSTAR) superconducting fusion device maintained a core condition in eventually generating fusion power, maintaining plasma at an ion temperature exceeding 100 million °C. (180 million °F) for a record 20 seconds.

=== Political, economic, cultural actions ===
Renewable energy capacity additions in 2020 expanded by more than 45% from 2019, including a 90% rise in global wind capacity (green) and a 23% expansion of new solar photovoltaic installations (yellow).

- In February, 17-year-old Swedish climate activist Greta Thunberg was nominated for the Nobel Peace Prize for a second time, having also received a nomination the preceding year.
- By April, the COVID-19 pandemic had forced the postponement of the COP26 climate change conference from November 2020 to the following year.
- In April, Austria and Sweden closed their last coal-fired power plants.
- In May, the Energy Information Administration announced that U.S. annual energy consumption from renewable sources exceeded coal consumption for the first time since before 1885.
- In the first half of 2020, the EU generated 40% of its electricity from renewables, and 34% from fossil fuels.
- On 14 October, a strategic alliance in Peru announced a climate commitment to make Machu Picchu the first of the New Seven Wonders of the World and the first international tourism destination to obtain carbon neutral certification.
- After October's Hurricane Delta struck Puerto Morelos, Mexico, an insurance company issued a payout (17 million pesos, or US$850,000) on a policy covering a coral reef. The policy was taken out to cover damages from hurricanes whose severity was expected to increase due to climate change.
- 4 November 2020 marked the completion of the process by which U.S. President Trump withdrew the country from the Paris climate agreement, the U.S. becoming the only country in the world to do so. President-elect Joe Biden vowed to recommit to the Paris accord on the first day of his presidency.
- On 27 November, Tasmanian minister for energy Guy Barnett announced that the Australian island state had achieved 100% self-sufficiency in renewable energy.

As a source of electric power in the EU, renewables overtook fossil fuels by 2020, and solar and wind together exceeded fossil fuels by 2025.

* On 3 December, the Danish government voted to immediately end new oil and gas exploration in the Danish North Sea as part of a plan to phase out fossil fuel extraction by 2050, guaranteeing an end to Denmark's fossil fuel production. Denmark's vote followed similar actions by France (2017) and New Zealand (2018).

- 12 December 2020 was the fifth anniversary of the 2015 Paris Agreement; countries review and update their national commitments every 5 years.
- In December, the Net Zero Asset Managers initiative—involving 30 fund management companies managing $9 trillion—pledged investment portfolios to be carbon-neutral by 2050.
- 2020 was the first year in which renewables overtook fossil fuels as the European Union's main source of electricity.
- Corporate declarations to partially or totally divest from fossil fuel companies were made by New York state pension fund ($226 billion), Sweden's pension fund AP2 ($43 billion), all six major U.S. banks (re Arctic drilling), Cambridge University's endowment ($4.5 billion), twelve large cities (totaling $295 billion), the U.K. National Employment Savings Trust (pension fund), Minnesota's pension fund ($4 billion), University of California ($126 billion), Cornell University endowment ($9.6 billion), Oxford University endowment ($3.7 billion), Denmark's ATP pension fund ($133 billion), and BlackRock.

=== Mitigation goal statements ===
- In January, the U.K.'s National Health Service announced its commitment to become the world's first net zero health system.
- In September, the government of China said it would achieve net-zero carbon emissions by 2060.
- On 28 October, South Korea president Moon Jae-in declared that the country—with only 6% of its electricity generated by renewables-would go carbon neutral by 2050, following similar declarations in Japan (earlier in the week) and the European Union (2019).
- Before the November 2020 U.S. presidential election, Joe Biden called climate change an existential threat to health, the economy and national security, proposing to make the U.S. carbon neutral by 2050; incumbent Donald Trump continued to question climate science, actually promoting fossil fuels.
- A 2 December United Nations report stated that at least 113 nations had pledged carbon neutrality by 2050, and that by early 2021, countries representing more than 65% of global CO_{2} emissions and more than 70% of the world economy, will have made ambitious commitments to carbon neutrality; and that 186 parties to the Paris Agreement had already developed NDCs.
- On 4 December, British Prime Minister Boris Johnson announced a target to reduce the UK's greenhouse gas emissions by 68% (previously 53%) by 2030 compared to 1990 levels, the government announcement saying the target "commits the UK to cutting emissions at the fastest rate of any major economy so far".
- On 11 December, EU leaders agreed to reduce greenhouse gases by 55% by 2030 (measured against 1990 CO_{2} emission levels); the European Parliament had called for a 60% cut, and Greenpeace and Global 2000, 65%.
- On 12 December, UN secretary general António Guterres told world leaders at the Climate Ambition Summit that they should all declare a state of climate emergency until the world reaches net-zero CO_{2} emissions (only about 38 had already made such declarations). Guterres noted that G20 countries were spending 50% more in their COVID-19 stimulus packages on fossil fuels and CO_{2}-intensive sectors than they were on low-CO_{2} energy.
- At the 12 December Climate Ambition Summit, China's leader Xi Jinping said that by 2030, China would reduce its carbon intensity by over 65 percent.

=== Adaptation goal statements ===
- At least 51 countries had developed plans for national health system adaptation planning. However, only 9% of countries reported having the funds to fully implement their plans.
- May 2021: A Carbon Disclosure Project survey found that in 2020, about 43% of 800 surveyed cities (combined population: 400 million) did not have a climate adaptation plan.

== Projections ==
- 15 January publication: The World Economic Forum listed top 10 risks over the next 10 years by likelihood (extreme weather as #1, climate action failure as #2, human-made environmental disasters as #5) and by impact (climate action failure as #1, extreme weather as #4, human-made environmental disasters as #9).
- 26 May publication: A study published in the PNAS projected that in a business-as-usual scenario, the geographical position of humans' temperature niche will shift more over the next 50 years than it has in the past 6000 years, and that one third of the global population will experience a mean annual temperature currently found in only 0.8% of the Earth's land surface.
- 22 July publication: A review conducted under the World Climate Research Programme (WCRP) projected climate sensitivity—the range of global warming to be expected from a doubling of CO_{2} concentration—to be 2.6—3.9 °C (4.7—7.0 °F), narrower than longstanding (1979+) estimates of about 1.5—4.5 °C (2.7—8.1 °F).
- 2 December publication: It was projected that to reach the Paris Climate Accord's 1.5 °C target, the 56 gigatonnes of CO_{2} equivalent (GtCO2e) emitted in 2020 would need to drop to 25 GtCO2e by 2030, requiring a 7.6% reduction every year—an increase in national government ambition of a factor of five.
- 9 December publication: The U.N.'s Emissions Gap (Note: The U.N. Emission Gap Report 2020 defines emissions gap for 2030 as "the difference between global total GHG emissions from least-cost scenarios that keep global warming to 2°C, 1.8°C or 1.5°C with varying levels of likelihood and the estimated global total GHG emissions resulting from a full implementation of the NDCs".) Report 2020 stated that, by 2030, annual emissions would need to be 15^{(range: 12–19)} GtCO2e lower than current unconditional NDCs imply for a 2 °C goal, and 32^{(range: 29–36)} GtCO2e lower for the 1.5 °C goal. Current NDCs were said to "remain seriously inadequate to achieve the climate goals of the Paris Agreement and would lead to a temperature increase of at least 3°C by the end of the century".

== Significant publications ==
- UNEP, UNEP DTU Partnership, World Adaptation Science Programme (WASP) (January 2021). "Adaptation Gap Report 2020". UNEP.org. United Nations Environment Programme. Archived from the original on 11 January 2021. (has link to PDF download)
- UNEP, UNEP DTU Partnership (9 December 2020). "Emissions Gap Report 2020". UNEP.org. United Nations Environment Programme. Archived from the original on 9 December 2020. "Yearly review of the difference between where greenhouse emissions are predicted to be in 2030 and where they should be to avoid the worst impacts of climate change."
- Watts, Nick; Amann, Markus; Arnell, Nigel; Ayeb-Karlsson, Sonja; et al. (2 December 2020). "The 2020 report of The Lancet Countdown on health and climate change: responding to converging crises". The Lancet. 397 (10269): 129–170. doi:10.1016/S0140-6736(20)32290-X. hdl:10278/3733808. PMID 33278353. S2CID 227250862.
- "Arctic Report Card: Update for 2020 / The sustained transformation to a warmer, less frozen and biologically changed Arctic remains clear" (PDF). arctic.NOAA.gov. National Oceanic and Atmospheric Administration (NOAA). December 2020. Archived (PDF) from the original on 8 December 2020. The "Report Card" includes:

- Perovich, D.; Meier, W.; Tschudi, M.; Hendricks, S.; et al. (December 2020). "Sea ice". NOAA.gov. National Oceanic and Atmospheric Administration (NOAA). doi:10.25923/n170-9h57. Archived from the original on 8 December 2020.
- York, A.; Bhatt, U.S.; Gargulinski, E.; Grabinski, Z.; et al. (December 2020). "Wildland Fire in High Northern Latitudes". NOAA.gov. National Oceanic and Atmospheric Administration (NOAA). doi:10.25923/2gef-3964. Archived from the original on 10 December 2020.

- Edmond, Charlotte (15 January 2020). "These are the top risks facing the world in 2020". WEForum.org. World Economic Forum. Archived from the original on 29 November 2020.
- Larson, Eric; Grieg, Chris; Jenkins, Jesse; Mayfield, Erin; et al. (15 December 2020). "Net-Zero America: Potential Pathways, Infrastructure and Impacts" (PDF). Princeton.edu. Princeton University. Archived (PDF) from the original on 2 March 2021.
- "The Sixth Status of Corals of the World: 2020 Report". GCRMN.net. Global Coral Reef Monitoring Network. October 2021. Archived from the original on 5 October 2021.
- "State of the Climate in Africa 2020 (WMO-No. 1275)". WMO.int. World Meteorological Organization. 19 October 2021. Archived from the original on 19 October 2021.

== See also ==
- 2020 in the environment and environmental sciences
- Climatology § History
- History of climate change policy and politics
- History of climate change science
- Politics of climate change § History
