= Anthropause =

Global reduction in modern human activity during the COVID-19 pandemic

The anthropause was a global reduction in modern human activity, especially travel, that occurred during the COVID-19 pandemic, particularly in March and April 2020. It was coined by a team of researchers in June 2020 in an article discussing the positive impact of the COVID-19 lockdown on wildlife and environment. The scientific journal that published the commentary, Nature Ecology and Evolution, selected the topic for the cover of its September issue, with the headline "Welcome to the anthropause". Oxford Languages highlighted the word "anthropause" in its 2020 Words of an Unprecedented Year report.

== Etymology ==
The word is a blended lexical item with phonological overlap, combining the prefix anthropo-, from anthropos (Ancient Greek: ἄνθρωπος) meaning "human", and the Greek word "pause" (Ancient Greek: παῦσις or Modern Greek: παύση); its literal translation is "human pause". In the Nature Ecology and Evolution article the authors explained that they noticed that people had started referring to the lockdown period as the Great Pause, however they felt that a more precise term would be considered helpful.

Anthropause is a neologism which has been used by social-media users, scientists, journalists, artists, and photographers, amongst others. William Gibson, the speculative fiction writer who coined the term "cyberspace" in 1982, posted a tweet on 23 June 2020 simply entitled "The Anthropause", linking to the article that introduced the term.

== Impact ==
Several global research projects are underway to investigate the effects of the COVID-19 anthropause. For example, a July 2020 study documented a global reduction of high-frequency seismic noise. A study published in 2022 showed correlations between air pollution and some human activities in several metropolitan regions of the United States. Another study, the COVID-19 Bio-Logging Initiative, uses animal tracking data collected before, during, and after lockdown, to assess how changes in human activity levels affected the movements and behaviour of a wide range of marine, terrestrial, and avian species. The Biological Conservation Journal published a special issue reuniting many scientific articles on the effects of the lockdowns on wildlife. The impacts were mitigated, with some species benefiting from the break in human activities, while others suffered from the break in conservation efforts. Because lockdown limitations largely prevented researchers from collecting ecological data in the field, most investigations of lockdown effects are limited to changes in activity patterns and distribution of species, or to incidents reported by the general population (e.g. number of car collisions with wildlife). Still, some teams managed to gather information on how the reduced human activity has affected physiological or demographic traits.

In 2021, an article published in The Geographical Journal historically situated the COVID-19 anthropause among other anthropause events that led to significant reductions in human activity, such as the Chernobyl nuclear disaster and the formation of the Korean Demilitarized Zone. The authors drew attention to how the anthropause was experienced unevenly by different groups of people and animals, and shed light on a range of pre-existing inequalities as many humans were not afforded the opportunity to pause during this time.

A paper published in December 2025 reported that a study of the dark-eyed junco population at the University of California, Los Angeles (UCLA) reports that the bill sizes and shapes of the birds changed during the anthropause. Prior to the Covid-19 restrictions the bill morphologies of the junco campus population were significantly different from local wild populations, thought at the time to be at least partly due to their diet being mostly the remains of processed foods consumed by campus humans. Birds born during the lockdown had bills that more closely resembled local wildland birds. After the lifting of pandemic restrictions the bills of hatchlings quickly returned to pre-Covid morphology. The paper's authors believe this is the first time morphological changes in wildlife in response to the anthropause have been documented.

== See also ==
- Anthropocene
