= Luke Howard =

Luke Howard may refer to:

- Luke Howard (meteorologist)
- Luke Howard (musician)
