= Sustainable Development Goal 15 =

15th of 17 Sustainable Development Goals to protect life on land

- Mission statement: "Protect, restore and promote sustainable use of terrestrial ecosystems, sustainably manage forests, combat desertification, and halt and reverse land degradation, and halt biodiversity loss"
- Commercial?: No
- Type of project: non-profit
- Location: Global
- Founder: United Nations
- Established: 2015
- Website: sdgs.un.org

Sustainable Development Goal 15 (SDG 15 or Global Goal 15) is about "Life on land". One of the 17 Sustainable Development Goals established by the United Nations in 2015, the official wording is: "Protect, restore and promote sustainable use of terrestrial ecosystems, sustainably manage forests, combat desertification, and halt and reverse land degradation and halt biodiversity loss". The Goal has 12 targets to be achieved by 2030. Progress towards targets will be measured by 14 indicators.

The nine outcome targets include: Conserve and restore terrestrial and freshwater ecosystems; end deforestation and restore degraded forests; end desertification and restore degraded land; ensure conservation of mountain ecosystems, protect biodiversity and natural habitats; protect access to genetic resources and fair sharing of the benefits; eliminate poaching and trafficking of protected species; prevent invasive alien species on land and in water ecosystems; and integrate ecosystem and biodiversity in governmental planning. The three means of implementation targets include: Increase financial resources to conserve and sustainably use ecosystem and biodiversity, finance and incentivize sustainable forest management; combat global poaching and trafficking.

An annual report is prepared by the Secretary-General of the United Nations evaluating the progress towards the Sustainable Development Goals. It provides data on changes in forest areas, desertification, biodiversity loss and other parameters that are of relevance for SDG 15.

== Targets, indicators and progress ==
The UN has defined 12 Targets and 14 Indicators for SDG 15. Five of them are to be achieved by the year 2020, two by the year 2030 and the rest have no target year.

Each of the targets also has one or more indicators to measure progress. In total there are fourteen indicators for SDG 15. FAO is the custodian agency for three of the indicators for SDG targets 15.1, 15.2 and 15.4.

=== Target 15.1: Conserve and restore terrestrial and freshwater ecosystems ===
The full title of Target 15.1 is: "By 2020, ensure the conservation, restoration and sustainable use of terrestrial and inland freshwater ecosystems and their services, in particular forests, wetlands, mountains and drylands, in line with obligation under international agreements."

This target has two indicators:

- Indicator 15.1.1: Forest area as a proportion of the total land area
- Indicator 15.1.2: Proportion of important sites for terrestrial and freshwater biodiversity that are covered by protected areas, by ecosystem type

Forests cover roughly 4 billion hectares or 30.7 per cent of the world's land area. 93 percent are natural forests and 7 percent are planted. The forest area is defined by the land under natural or planted groups of trees of at least 5 meters in situ. The trees can be either be productive or non-productive and should not include fruit plantations and agroforestry systems and trees in urban parks and gardens. Protected areas are defined by three indicators: 1) the proportion of total terrestrial area classified as protected 2) the proportion of important sites of terrestrial biodiversity who are protected 3) and proportion of important sites of freshwater biodiversity that are protected.

=== Target 15.2: End deforestation and restore degraded forests ===
The full title of Target 15.2 is: "By 2020, promote the implementation of sustainable management of all types of forests, halt deforestation, restore degraded forests and substantially increase afforestation and reforestation globally."

This target has one Indicator: Indicator 15.2.1 is the "Progress towards sustainable forest management".

The United Nations General Assembly has defined Sustainable forest management as a dynamic and evolving concept that aims to maintain and enhance the economic, social and environmental values of all types of forests, for the benefit of present and future generations (Resolution A/RES/62/98). It aims to find a balance between the increasing demands for forest products and the benefits as well as preserving the health and diversity of the forests.

SDG indicator 15.2.1 is composed of five sub-indicators that measure progress towards all dimensions of sustainable forest management. They provide qualification to the management of forest areas and assess areas with a set on national and international standards.

=== Target 15.3: End desertification and restore degraded land ===
The full title of Target 15.3 is: "By 2030, combat desertification, restore degraded land and soil, including land affected by desertification, drought and floods, and strive to achieve a land degradation-neutral world."

This target has one indicator: Indicator 15.3.1 is the "Proportion of land that is degraded over the total land area".

Desertification affects as much as one-sixth of the world's population, 70% of all drylands, and one-quarter of the total land area of the world. It also leads to spreading poverty and the degradation of billion hectares of cropland.

=== Target 15.4: Ensure conservation of mountain ecosystems ===
Mountain Green Cover Index, OWID

The full title of Target 15.4 is: "By 2030, ensure the conservation of mountain ecosystems, including their biodiversity, to enhance their capacity to provide benefits that are essential for sustainable development."

This target has two indicators:

- Indicator 15.4.1: Coverage by protected areas of important sites for mountain biodiversity
- Indicator 15.4.2: Mountain Green Cover Index

The Mountain Green Cover Index measured the percentage of mountain environments covered by green areas and the capacity of those areas to fulfil their ecosystem roles.

As of 2017, 76% of the world's mountain areas were covered by green vegetation, including forests, shrubs, grassland and cropland. The Mountain Green Cover was lowest in Western Asia and Northern Africa (60%) and highest in Oceania (96%).

Red List Index (2019)

=== Target 15.5: Protect biodiversity and natural habitats ===
The full title of Target 15.5 is: "Take urgent and significant action to reduce the degradation of natural habitats, halt the loss of biodiversity and, by 2020, protect and prevent the extinction of threatened species."

This target has one indicator: Indicator 15.5.1 is the "Red List Index".

A report in 2018 stated that "biodiversity must be mainstreamed across these sectors and spatial planning integrated accordingly."

=== Target 15.6: Protect access to genetic resources and fair sharing of the benefits ===
The full title of Target 15.6 is: "Promote fair and equitable sharing of the benefits arising from the utilization of genetic resources and promote appropriate access to such resources, as internationally agreed."

This target has one indicator: Indicator 15.6.1 is the "Number of countries that have adopted legislative, administrative and policy frameworks to ensure fair and equitable sharing of benefits".

Nagoya Protocol

This indicator is used to track countries' participation in protocols related to the promotion and sharing of genetic resources for plants, food and agriculture.

=== Target 15.7: Eliminate poaching and trafficking of protected species ===
The full title of Target 15.7 is: "Take urgent action to end poaching and trafficking of protected species of flora and fauna and address both demand and supply of illegal wildlife products."

This target has one Indicator: Indicator 15.7.1 is the "Proportion of traded wildlife that was poached or illicitly trafficked".

In general, wildlife trade policies that incentivize sustainable use typically have more immediate positive effects on wildlife populations than outright trade bans.

No data is available for this indicator yet.

=== Target 15.8: Prevent invasive alien species on land and in water ecosystems ===
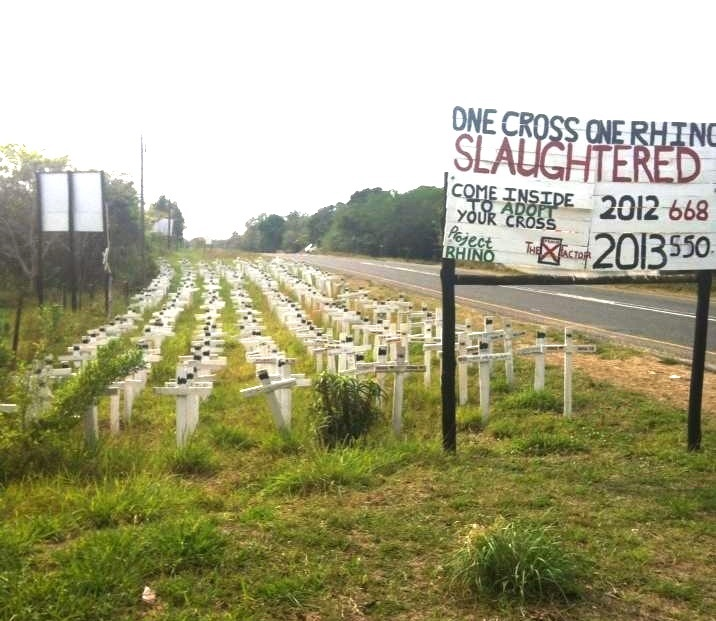
Memorial to rhinos killed by poachers near St Lucia Estuary, South Africa

The full title of Target 15.8 is: "By 2020, introduce measures to prevent the introduction and significantly reduce the impact of invasive alien species on land and water ecosystems and control or eradicate the priority species."

This target has one Indicator: Indicator is 15.8.1 is the "Proportion of countries adopting relevant national legislation and adequately resourcing the prevention or control of invasive alien species".

Wildlife poaching and trafficking threaten biodiversity and ecosystems as well as local livelihoods, wellbeing and security. Trafficking is normally driven by organized crime, and made easy by corruption and weak governance.

=== Target 15.9: Integrate ecosystem and biodiversity in governmental planning ===
The full title of Target 15.9 is: "By 2020, integrate ecosystem and biodiversity values into national and local planning, development processes, poverty reduction strategies and accounts."

Indicator is 15.9.1 is the "Progress towards national targets established in accordance with Aichi Biodiversity Target 2 of the Strategic Plan for Biodiversity 2011–2020".

"Aichi Biodiversity Target 2" addresses the underlying causes of biodiversity loss.

=== Target 15.a: Increase financial resources to conserve and sustainably use ecosystem and biodiversity ===
Total official development assistance for biodiversity, by recipient, OWID

The full title of Target 15.a is: "Mobilize and significantly increase financial resources from all sources to conserve and sustainably use biodiversity and ecosystems."

This target has one Indicator: Indicator 15.a.1 is the "Official development assistance and public expenditure on conservation and sustainable use of biodiversity and ecosystems".

=== Target 15.b: Finance and incentivize sustainable forest management ===
The full title of Target 15.b is: "Mobilize significant resources from all sources and at all levels to finance sustainable forest management and provide adequate incentives to developing countries to advance such management, including for conservation and reforestation."

This target has one indicator: Indicator 15.b.1 is the "Official development assistance and public expenditure on conservation and sustainable use of biodiversity and ecosystems".

This target aims at mobilizing resources at all levels to finance sustainable forest management. The United Nations Strategic Plan for Forests 2017–2030 (UNSPF) presents a global framework for actions at all levels to sustainably manage forests and halt deforestation and forest degradation.

=== Target 15.c: Combat global poaching and trafficking ===
The full title of Target 15.c is: "Enhance global support for efforts to combat poaching and trafficking of protected species, including by increasing the capacity of local communities to pursue sustainable livelihood opportunities."

This target has one indicator: Indicator 15.c.1 is the "Proportion of traded wildlife that was poached or illicitly trafficked".

The illegal trade and animal trafficking have grown significantly to become one of the world's largest black markets valued at tens of billions of dollars. The challenges to combat global poaching and trafficking need to be addressed by enforcing laws and strengthening institutions.

== Custodian agencies ==
The custodian agencies are responsible for data gathering and reporting on the indicators. They are:

- Indicator 15.1.1, 15.2.1 and 15.4.2: Food and Agriculture Organization (FAO)
- Indicator 15.1.2: United Nations Environmental Programme-World Conservation Monitoring Center (UNEP-WCMC) and United Nations Environmental Programme
- Indicator 15.3.1 and 15.4.1: United Nations Convention to Combat Desertification (UNCCD)
- Indicator 15.5.1 and 15.8.1: International Union for Conservation of Nature (IUCN)
- Indicator 15.6.1: Convention on Biological Diversity (CBD-Secretariat)
- Indicator 15.7.1 and 15.c.1: United Nations Office on Drugs and Crime, and Convention for International Trade in Endangered Species (CITIES)
- Indicator 15.9.1: Convention on Biological Diversity (CBD-Secretariat) and United Nations Environmental Programme (UNEP)
- Indicator 15.a.1, 15.6.1 and 15.b.1: Organization for Economic Cooperation and Development (OECD), United Nations Environmental Programme (UNEP) and World Bank (WB)

== Monitoring and progress ==
An annual report is prepared by the Secretary-General of the United Nations evaluating the progress towards the Sustainable Development Goals. According to the expert group meeting in preparation for the High-level Political Forum of 2018, SDG 15 needs more indicators in areas such as forest intactness, management effectiveness of protected areas, and meaningful integration of biodiversity into other processes.

== Challenges ==
As of 2023, there is approximately a $700 billion gap in financial support to help low-income countries protect biodiversity.

=== Impacts of COVID-19 pandemic ===
In 2020, there was brief progress on SDGs 12 to 15 on sustainable production and consumption, climate action and biodiversity conservation, but these gains were quickly offset once restrictions were lifted. This applies to CO_{2} emissions, which declined in major economies during lockdowns, but went quickly back to their pre-pandamic levels after restrictions were lifted. It is estimated that deforestation increased by 12% from 2019 to 2020, and plastic consumption and waste may also increase during pandemic.

== Links with other SDGs ==
The UN 17 Sustainable Development Goals are inherently interconnected, most of the goals can be achieved only when others are also achieved. And achieving any individual goal tends to help the achievement of the other goals.

The impact of SDG 15 on gender equality (SDG 5) is also significant. In many parts of the world, women are farmers, especially poor women living in rural areas. They are the main labor force in growing crops, often depend on forests for fuel, fodder and food. Their limited ownership of the land reduces their ability to adapt to losses or decide how to use it. By protecting biodiversity and thus maintaining agricultural productivity, can also empower gender equality. When forest conditions and regeneration improve, women themselves will get a greater political voice.

For SDG 6 and SDG 7, the availability and quality of water from the functioning of ecosystems, especially forest ecological system. Protecting biodiversity, and maintaining the integrity of wetlands and forests play a huge role in the acquisition and replenishment of freshwater resources because natural ecosystems act as filters to clean water and protect it from diseases that can harm the animal or human health.

SDG 15 has a direct link to SDG 8 includes high-yield agriculture and tourism, which attracts tourists through protected ecosystems and biodiverse environments, thereby enhancing economic returns.

Maintaining biodiversity plays a vital role in helping to mitigate and adapt to climate change. Mangrove forests, for example, account for approximately 1% of carbon sequestration by the world's forests, but about 14% by the global ocean. Therefore, negative impacts on mangrove habitats can result in very high GHG emissions. The impact of land-based activities such as agriculture, land reclamation and urban development on ecosystems demonstrates the high degree of linkage between SDG 13, SDG 14 and SDG 15, and the importance of the overall management of all three.
