= 2021 in climate change =

This article documents events, research findings, scientific and technological advances, and human actions to measure, predict, mitigate, and adapt to the effects of global warming and climate change—during the year 2021.

== Summaries ==
2021 is a make or break year...

... to confront the global climate emergency. ... Today's interim report from the UNFCCC shows governments are nowhere close to the level of ambition needed to limit climate change to 1.5 degrees and meet the goals of the Paris Agreement. The major emitters must step up with much more ambitious emissions reductions targets for 2030 in their Nationally Determined Contributions well before the November (2021) UN Climate Conference.

— UN Secretary-General António Guterres, 26 February 2021
- 26 February: The United Nations Synthesis Report on Nationally Determined Contributions under the Paris Agreement stated that "estimated reductions referred to in paragraphs (on greenhouse gas emissions) fall far short of what is required, demonstrating the need for Parties to further strengthen their mitigation commitments under the Paris Agreement".
- 21 June: the World Meteorological Organization wrote that "2021 is a make-or-break year for climate action, with the window to prevent the worst impacts of climate change—which include ever more frequent more intense droughts, floods and storms—closing rapidly."
- 28 July: a follow-on to the 2019 World Scientists' Warning of a Climate Emergency noted "an unprecedented surge in climate-related disasters since 2019" and stated there is "mounting evidence that we are nearing or have already crossed tipping points associated with critical parts of the Earth system".
- 6 September: editors from over 200 health journals published a joint editorial stating "The science is unequivocal; a global increase of 1.5 °C above the pre-industrial average and the continued loss of biodiversity risk catastrophic harm to health that will be impossible to reverse.... The greatest threat to global public health is the continued failure of world leaders to keep the global temperature rise below 1.5 °C and to restore nature."
- 30 September: UN Secretary-General António Guterres stated that "time is running out. Irreversible climate tipping points lie alarmingly close." He called for more ambition as current NDCs will lead to a rise of 2.7 °C, saying that "all leaders must recognize that we are in the middle of a climate emergency".

== Measurements and statistics ==
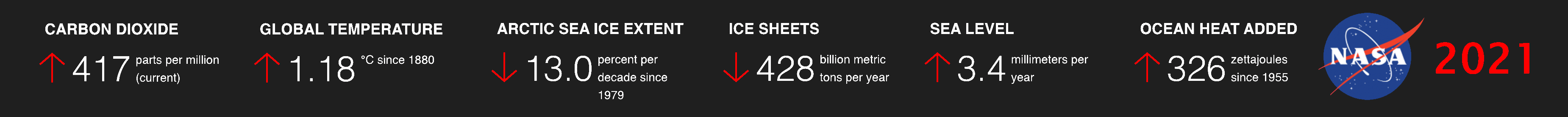
"Vital Signs of the Planet" as presented by NASA on 31 December 2021

- 25 January: a review article published in The Cryosphere reported that Earth lost 28 trillion tonnes of ice between 1994 and 2017, 68% being from atmospheric melting and 32% by oceanic melting. The rate of ice loss rose 57% since the 1990s–from 0.8 to 1.2 trillion tonnes per year–raising global sea level 34.6 ±3.1 mm in that time period.
- 9 February: a study published in Environmental Research concluded that airborne fine particulate matter (PM_{2.5}) caused by burning fossil fuels causes 8.7 million premature deaths annually, including China (2.4 million), India (2.5 million) and parts of eastern US, Europe and Southeast Asia.
- 16 February: study results published in the PNAS (study's time period: 1990–2018) reported widespread advances and lengthening of pollen seasons (up to 20 days) and increases in pollen concentrations (up to 21%) across North America, with human forcing of the climate system contributing about 50% of the trend in pollen seasons and about 8% of the trend in pollen concentrations.
- Atlantic meridional overturning circulation (AMOC):

- 25 February: a Nature Geoscience article reported an "unprecedented" (since AD 400) decline in the twentieth century of the Atlantic meridional overturning circulation (AMOC), which is now in its weakest state in more than 1,000 years. The AMOC redistributes heat on the planet and has a major impact on climate. In particular, weakness in the AMOC, which includes the Florida Current and the Gulf Stream, counteracts its moderating effect on the climate in Europe.
- 5 August: a study published in Nature Climate Change presented "spatially consistent empirical evidence that, in the course of the last century, the AMOC may have evolved from relatively stable conditions to a point close to a critical transition".

- February: measurements from Mauna Loa Observatory showed that, for the first time, atmospheric CO_{2} levels reached 417 parts per million (ppm), a concentration 50% higher than the 278ppm pre-industrial level.
- March: Global Energy Monitor published a study on coal mine methane emissions which found that hundreds of newly proposed coal mines could emit 13.5 million tonnes of methane annually.
- 8 March: a study published in Nature Climate Change—studying the combined effects of average global sea level rise and natural and human-induced subsidence—estimated that subsiding coastal locations (Note: The Nature Climate Change article (2021-03-08) stated that "coastal inhabitants are preferentially located in subsiding locations", and advocated "appropriate policy for groundwater utilization and drainage" that would "offer substantial and rapid benefits to reduce growth of coastal flood exposure due to relative sea-level rise".) may locally experience up to four times more relative sea level rise than could be attributed to global sea level rise alone.
- 17 March: a study by the International Federation of Red Cross and Red Crescent Societies estimated that, globally between September 2020 and February 2021, 12.5 million people were displaced by adverse impacts of climate change, the annual average exceeding 20 million.
- 17 March: a study published in Nature estimated that trawling's disturbance of carbon stored in sea beds can re-mineralize sedimentary carbon into CO_{2} amounts equivalent to 15–20% of the atmospheric CO_{2} absorbed by the ocean each year, and comparable to that of terrestrial farming.
- 18 March: a study accepted for publication in Environmental Research Letters estimated that the severity of heatwave and drought impacts on crop production in Europe roughly tripled over the preceding 50 years, from –2.2 (1964–1990) to -7.3% (1991–2015).
- 1 April: a study published in Nature Climate Change estimated that anthropogenic climate change has reduced global agricultural total factor productivity by about 21% since 1961, and 26–34% in warmer regions such as Africa, Latin America and the Caribbean.
- 7 April: NOAA reported carbon dioxide levels were higher than at anytime in the past 3.6 million years, in the Mid-Pliocene Warm Period when sea level was about 24 mm (78 ft) higher than today and the average temperature was about 4 °C (7 °F) higher than in pre-industrial times.
- NOAA's redefinition of "average" and "normal":

- April: NOAA's Climate Prediction Center (CPC) states it will use 1991–2020 as the new 30-year period of record, with "average" numbers of named Atlantic storms rising from 12 to 14, hurricanes from 6 to 7, and major hurricanes remaining at 3; Eastern Pacific and Central Pacific numbers remain unchanged over 1981–2010.
- May: NOAA's NCEI supersedes weather and climate data from 1981–2010 with data from 1991–2020 to change its designation of "Climate Normal", resulting in fewer days being characterized as having "above normal" temperature.

- 28 April: a study published in Nature attributed 21±3% of the observed sea-level rise from 2000–2019 to melting glaciers (267±16 gigatonnes per year), and identified a mass loss acceleration of 48±16 gigatonnes per year per decade.
- 11 May: a study published in Nature Communications estimated that land use change affected 32% of the global land area from 1960 to 2019, about four times greater than previously estimated.
- 20 May: The Arctic Monitoring and Assessment Programme reported that, from 1971 to 2019, the annually averaged Arctic near-surface air temperature increased by 3.1 °C, three times faster than the global average.
- 21 May: a study published in Geophysical Research Letters reported that, despite greater raw warming in high latitudes, the tropics have greater normalized warming and actually experienced more record-breaking heat events from 1960 to 2019.
- 24 May: a study published in Nature Geoscience reported mercury in Greenland ice sheet meltwater being two orders of magnitude higher than from Arctic rivers, and, accounting for about 10% of the estimated global riverine flux, estimated it to be globally significant.
- 31 May: a study published in Nature Climate Change concluded that 37% of warm-season heat-related deaths from 1991 to 2018 can be attributed to anthropogenic climate change and that increased mortality is evident on every continent.
- 4 June: a study published in Science Advances concluded that previous estimates of CO_{2} emissions caused by human cultivation of peatlands from 1750 to 2018 should be increased by 18% to account for emissions from cultivated northern peatlands in calculating the carbon budget.
- 15 June: a study accepted for publication in Geophysical Research Letters reported that satellite and in situ observations independently show an approximate doubling of Earth's Energy Imbalance (EEI) from mid-2005 to mid-2019.
- 28 July: a study published in Nature Communications revealed a significant positive global energy imbalance based on satellite observations from 2001 to 2020, and concluded that there is less than 1% probability that this imbalance can be explained by natural internal variability of the climate system.

In 2021, wind and solar power reached a record 10% of global electricity. Shown: 20 leading countries.

- 31 August: the WMO published an Atlas of Mortality and Economic Losses from Weather, Climate and Water Extremes (1970–2019), indicating that the number of disasters has increased by a factor of five, driven by climate change, more extreme weather and improved reporting; but because of improved early warnings and disaster management the number of deaths decreased almost three-fold.
- 1 September: a study published in Nature found that since 2001, fires in the Amazon rainforest had potentially impacted ranges of 77.3–85.2% of threatened species in the region, reducing the biodiversity that contributes to the ecological and climatic stability of the Amazon Basin.
- 12 October: a study published in the Proceedings of the NAS estimated a nearly 200% increase in urban heat extremes among 13,115 urban areas from 1983 to 2016.
- October: The Global Coral Reef Monitoring Network's Status of Coral Reefs of the World reported that "between 2009 and 2018, there was a progressive loss amounting to 14% of the coral from the world's coral reefs, which is more than all the coral currently living on Australia's coral reefs".
- 30 March 2022: Ember's Global Electricity Review reported that in 2021, wind and solar power reached a record 10% of global electricity, with clean power being 38% of supply, more than coal's 36%. However, demand growth rebounded, leading to a record rise in coal power and emissions.
- 7 April 2022: NOAA reported an annual increase in global atmospheric methane of 17 parts per billion (ppb) in 2021—averaging 1,895.7 ppb in that year—the largest annual increase recorded since systematic measurements began in 1983. The increase during 2020 was 15.3 ppb, itself a record increase.

== Natural events and phenomena ==
- 7 February: a rock-ice avalanche in the Chamoli district in the Indian Himalayan Mountains killed dozens and left hundreds missing. (Note: Outburst floods such as the one in India can result from rockfall causing a glacier to fragment and avalanche, or by collapse of dams of debris left behind by retreating glaciers that had formed lakes of water formed from glacier melt. (See The New York Times article of 8 Feb 2021.)) The death count grew to 204, with 27 million cubic meters of rock and ice collapsing. (Note: Shugar et al. 2021 wrote, "Although we cannot attribute this individual disaster specifically to climate change, the possibly increasing frequency of high-mountain slope instabilities can likely be related to observed atmospheric warming and corresponding long-term changes in cryospheric conditions (glaciers, permafrost). Multiple factors beyond those listed above contributed to the Chamoli rock and ice avalanche, including the geologic structure and steep topography, possible long-term thermal disturbances in permafrost bedrock induced by atmospheric warming, stress changes due to the decline and collapse of adjacent and overlying glaciers, and enhanced melt water infiltration during warm periods.")
- March: a Science Brief review of >90 peer-reviewed scientific articles reported consensus that ocean warming from human-induced climate change is likely fueling more powerful tropical cyclones (Note: Science Brief defines "tropical cyclones" to include tropical storms, hurricanes, and typhoons.) with increased precipitation rates (through enhanced atmospheric moisture), the increased power and rising sea levels amplifying flooding. Models project that some regions will experience increases in rapid intensification, a poleward migration of the latitude of maximum intensity or a slowing of the forward motion of the storms. Most climate model studies project the annual number of tropical cyclones to decrease or remain approximately the same.
A Remarkable Year for Earth's Climate

- 2021 was consistent with the long-term human-caused global warming trend of about 0.2 °C (0.36 °F) per decade.
- From India to England, Russia, China, New Zealand, the U.S., Indonesia, Uganda, Germany, ... extreme precipitation and flooding over the span of just a few months.
- Extreme heat waves punished Japan, Ireland, Turkey, western North America, and England. The record-shattering extreme heatwave in the Pacific Northwest likely killed more than 1,000 people.
- Western North America, Siberia, and the Mediterranean region experienced intense droughts.

— Dana Nuccitelli
Yale Climate Connections
- 5 March: an article published in Science concluded that the Atlantic Multidecadal Oscillation is not an internal multidecadal (40- to 60-year) oscillation distinct from climate noise, but is instead a manifestation of competing time-varying effects of anthropogenic greenhouse gases and sulfate aerosols.
- 11 March: a review article published in Frontiers in Forests and Global Change concluded that warming from non-CO_{2} agents (especially CH_{4} and N_{2}O) in the Amazon basin largely offsets—and most likely exceeds—the climate change mitigating effect of the region's CO_{2} uptake.
- 22 March: a study published in Geophysical Research Letters concluded that accelerated decline in terrestrial water storage (TWS) caused by glacial ice melting was the main driver of a rapid eastward drift of the geographic North Pole after the 1990s.
- 26 March: the full bloom date of cherry blossoms in Kyoto, Japan—when the majority of buds are open to the skies—occurred earlier than any time since records began in the year 812 CE; historically, the bloom date occurs about 17 April.
- 9 April: a study published in Nature Communications citing multiple complementary lines of evidence, reported methane-oxidising bacteria (MOB) dwelling in the bark of Melaleuca quinquenervia (a paper bark tree common in Australia) reduced methane emissions by 36±5%.
- 13 April: a study of fruitflies published in Nature Communications found that the temperature at which male fertility is lost is much lower than critical thermal limits (CTLs) for survival, suggesting that species, especially tropical species, are more vulnerable to extinction than previously presumed, and that evolution and plasticity are unlikely to rescue populations from extinction.
- 16 April: Science published results of a study of boreal forests, concluding that forest fires shifted tree dominance from slow-growing black spruce to fast-growing deciduous broadleaf trees, resulting in a net increase in carbon storage and suggesting potential mitigation of the feedback effect of boreal forest fires to global warming.
- 17 April: winds of Typhoon Surigae rapidly intensified by 170 km/h (105 mph) in 36 hours to reach 306 km/h (190 mph), becoming the strongest tropical cyclone of 2021 worldwide.
- 14 June: a study published in the Proceedings of the National Academy of Sciences concluded that Rocky Mountain subalpine forests are burning more than at any point in the past 2,000 years, with contemporary rates of burning being 22% higher than the maximum rate reconstructed over the past two millennia.
- 18 June: a study published in Nature Communications—accounting for sea level rise, storm surge, and wave runup at exposed open coasts—estimated that globally aggregated annual overtopping hours had increased by almost 50% over the preceding two decades.
- Late June: the 2021 Western North America heat wave set a new all-time Canadian temperature record of 49.6 °C (121.28 °F), World Weather Attribution concluding that heat waves of such intensity would be at least 150 times rarer without human-induced climate change.
- 14 July: a study published in Nature found that the intensification of the dry season and an increase in deforestation seem to promote higher carbon emissions in the eastern Amazon, in line with studies that indicate an increase in tree mortality as a result of climatic changes across Amazonia.
- 10 August: studying the 2020 heat wave in Siberia, a study published in the PNAS suggested that gas hydrates trapped in carbonate rock formations became unstable, possibly "add(ing) unknown quantities of methane to the atmosphere in the near future"—in addition to that long known to be produced from microbial decay of organic matter.
- 14 August: the >3000 m peak of the Greenland ice sheet experienced rain for the first known time in recorded history, in one of nine instances in the past 2,000 years in which the temperature exceeded the freezing point.
- 2 March 2023: a study published in Science said that boreal fires, typically accounting for 10% of global fire CO_{2} emissions, contributed 23% in 2021, by far the highest fraction since 2000. 2021 was an abnormal year because North American and Eurasian boreal forests synchronously experienced their greatest water deficit.

== Actions, and goal statements ==
=== Science and technology ===
- 8 February: XPrize announced a competition to bestow its largest-ever prize, $100 million donated by Elon Musk to be awarded in 2025, for technology to remove carbon from air or water. Winning entries must show an ability to scale up to removing billions of metric tons of carbon.
- February: Porsche announced trials to start in 2022 to develop synthetic fuel that it claims will have the same "well to wheel impact"—CO_{2} produced throughout manufacture and sale—as electric vehicles.
- February and earlier: Aptera Motors indicated it would produce in 2021 a three-wheel, highly aerodynamic electric vehicle powered by 34 square feet of solar cells, also having rechargeable batteries.
- Late February: a Cambridge University study estimated that bitcoin mining energy consumption—at that time on the order of 100 terawatt-hours annually—possessed a carbon footprint equivalent to Argentina's, a figure likely increased by interest in bitcoin in early 2021 from major Wall Street institutions.
- March: The Guardian reported on the design of "Vortex Bladeless", a curved-top cylindrical turbine whose main body oscillates resonantly with the wind to generate electricity, the design occupying a much smaller footprint than blade-driven wind turbines.
- 18 March: a feasibility study published in Nature Sustainability described how suspending solar panels above water canals not only reduces evaporation and mitigates land use, but increases the efficiency of the panels due to the water's cooling effect.
- Reported 30 March: taking advantage of generally stronger winds further from shore, the world's first floating windfarm, a 30 megawatt facility 15 mi (24 km) off Aberdeenshire, Scotland, broke records for energy output.
- 31 March: a study published in the PNAS concluded that if food waste is diverted from landfills to avoid methane emissions, food-waste-derived n-paraffin volatile fatty acid-based sustainable aviation fuels could enable up to a 165% reduction in greenhouse gas emissions relative to fossil-derived aviation fuels.
- 9 April: the World Economic Forum described how companies can use microorganisms to convert CO_{2} into a protein powder for use in animal feed.
- 14 May: a study published in Science Advances described a distributed temperature sensing (DTS) system achieving a vertical resolution of ~0.65 m (~25 in.) along a fiber-optic cable, a two-order-of-magnitude improvement over discretely-spaced sensor arrangements. In the Greenland ice sheet, the optical fiber system discovered strong spatial heterogeneity in deformation between and within different ice sections.
- 8 June: a study published in Environmental Research Letters concluded that artificial ocean alkalinisation (AOA), if carried out with sufficient magnitude and duration, can use current technology to reverse the impact of global ocean acidification on the Great Barrier Reef until atmospheric CO_{2} concentrations return to today's values—possibly centuries in the future.
- August reports: in the first customer delivery of its type in history, Swedish company Hybrit said it was delivering "green steel" to truck-maker Volvo AB for prototype vehicles, the steel made using renewable electricity and hydrogen rather than coking coal.
- 8 September: the largest direct air capture plant, collecting about 4,000 tons of atmospheric CO_{2}} a year to store it underground, began operation in Iceland, selling the most expensive carbon offset in the world for as much as almost $1,400 per ton.
- 5 October: the Nobel Prize in Physics was awarded "for the physical modeling of Earth's climate, quantifying variability and reliably predicting global warming" to atmospheric physicist Syukuro Manabe (modeled a 40 km (25 mi) high vertical column) and Klaus Hasselmann (developed a model incorporating stochastics (chaotic systems) and identifying human "fingerprints" in climatic effects).

=== Political, economic, legal, and cultural actions ===
- From 1 March 2019: the United Nations declared 2021 to be the beginning of the UN Decade on Ecosystem Restoration, having an "aim of supporting and scaling up efforts to prevent, halt and reverse the degradation of ecosystems worldwide and raise awareness of the importance of successful ecosystem restoration".

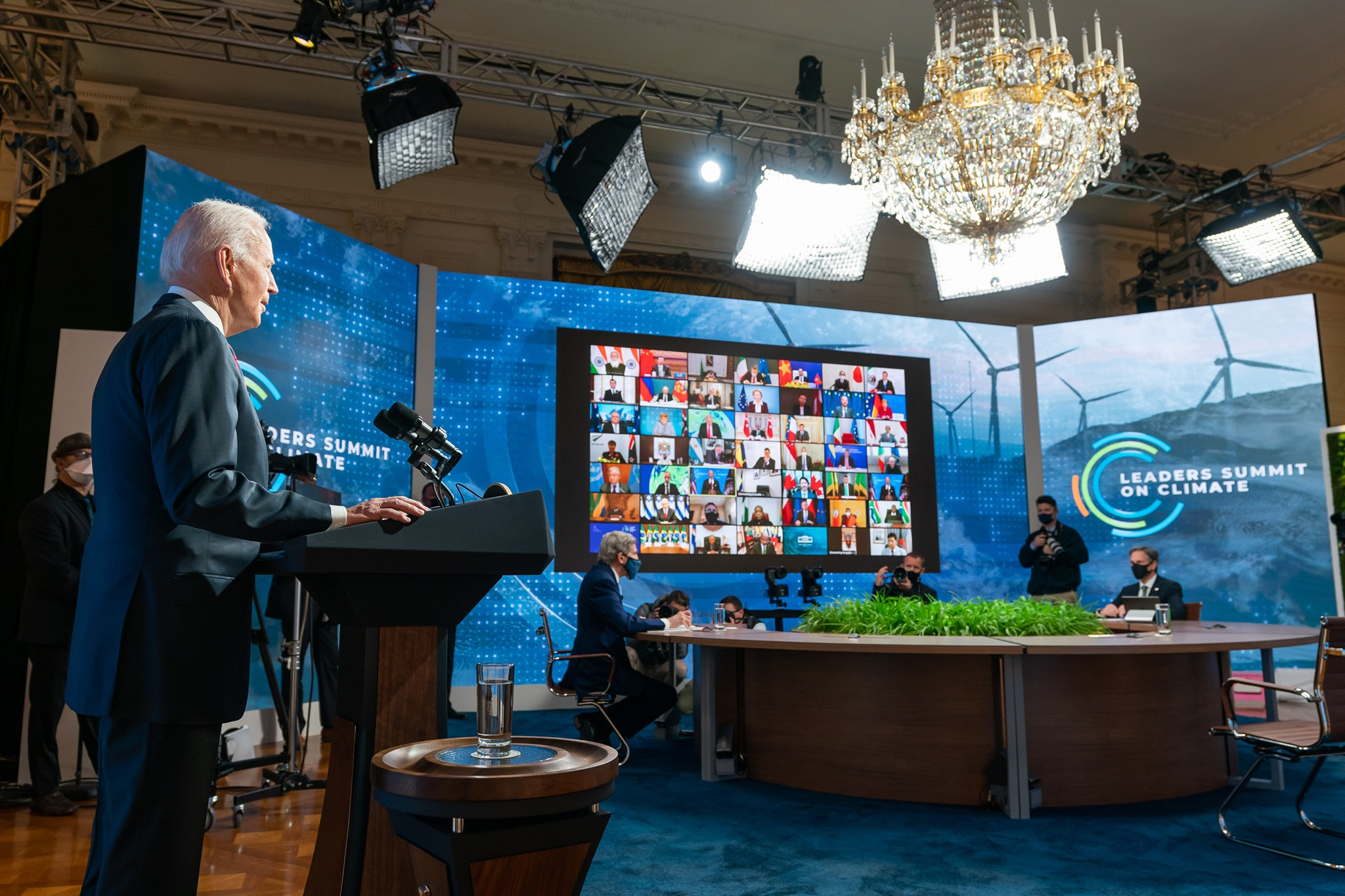
U.S. President Joe Biden at the Leaders Summit on Climate in April, held virtually because of the COVID-19 pandemic

- 5 January 2021: a Senate run-off election in the U.S. state of Georgia placed the Democratic party in narrow control of both houses of Congress, as both U.S. Senate Democratic candidates from the state of Georgia, Raphael Warnock and Jon Ossoff win those elections, improving Democratic President Biden's prospects for implementing climate-related policies. Both Raphael Warnock and Jon Ossoff are supporters and advocates the Green New Deal, proposed for the United States.
- 15 January: France's Total—among Europe's top energy companies that had accelerated plans to cut emissions and build large renewable energy businesses—became the first major global energy company to quit the American Petroleum Institute lobby group, whose largest members resisted investor pressure to diversify to renewables.
- 20 January: on the afternoon of his inauguration, U.S. President Joe Biden signed a letter re-committing the nation to the Paris Agreement, a 2015 climate accord, reversing Donald Trump's withdrawal that took formal effect on 4 November 2020 (the U.S. had been the only country in the world not signatory to the accord.) The White House website was promptly changed to recite that Biden "will take swift action to tackle the climate emergency", reversing Trump's removing mention of greenhouse gas emissions on his first day in office in 2017.
- 28 January: General Motors said that by 2035 it will end sale of all gasoline and diesel powered passenger cars and light SUVs (excluding medium and heavy duty trucks), and will sell about 30 types of electric vehicles, and planned to halt and review new oil and gas leases on federal lands and waters.
- January: newly elected U.S. President Joe Biden promised to make the federal government's fleet of 645,000 vehicles 100% all-electric by 2030.
- Late January: NRG Energy announced that it would be indefinitely shutting down the U.S.'s only remaining facility for carbon capture and storage (CCS), generally presented by the fossil fuel industry as a "clean coal" technology.
- 1 February: ExxonMobil announced it would invest $3 billion through 2025 (about 3% to 4% of its planned annual capital expenditures) on lower-emission energy technologies, primarily carbon capture and storage projects—distinguished from BP and Royal Dutch Shell who are pursuing renewables.
- Reported in February: Mexico's populist president Andrés Manuel López Obrador indicated intentions to pursue fossil fuel projects and curtail clean energy, pursuing energy sovereignty with state-run bodies and relegating private clean energy companies to a secondary role.
- 16 February: billionaire philanthropist Bill Gates published the book, How to Avoid a Climate Disaster.
Burden on future generations

One generation must not be allowed to consume large portions of the CO_{2} budget while bearing a relatively minor share of the reduction effort if this would involve leaving subsequent generations with a drastic reduction burden and expose their lives to comprehensive losses of freedom. (Note: The German high court specifically cited the goals of the Paris Convention as impacting the freedom of future generations: "The constitutional climate goal arising from Article 20a GG is more closely defined in accordance with the Paris target as being to limit the increase in the global average temperature to well below 2 °C and preferably to 1.5 °C above pre-industrial levels. For this target to be reached, the reductions still necessary after 2030 will have to be achieved with ever greater speed and urgency. These future obligations to reduce emissions have an impact on practically every type of freedom because virtually all aspects of human life still involve the emission of greenhouse gases and are thus potentially threatened by drastic restrictions after 2030. * * * (O)ne generation must not be allowed to consume large portions of the CO_{2} budget while bearing a relatively minor share of the reduction effort if this would involve leaving subsequent generations with a drastic reduction burden and expose their lives to comprehensive losses of freedom.")

— German Federal Constitutional Court
April 2021
- 17 February: Ford said that by 2026 its European division, with 5% of that region's passenger car market, will offer only electric and plug-in hybrid models, and by 2030 all its passenger cars will run solely on batteries.
- 2 March: Volvo said that it will convert its entire lineup to battery power by 2030 and will sell them exclusively online—no longer selling cars with internal combustion engines, including hybrids.
- 25 March: the Supreme Court of Canada ruled constitutional, (Note: The Court reasoned that global warming causes harm beyond provincial boundaries and that it is a matter of national concern under the "peace, order and good government" clause of the Constitution. The majority noted the Act would only apply where provincial or territorial pricing systems are not strict enough to reduce global warming.) the Greenhouse Gas Pollution Pricing Act (2018), which required provinces and territories to implement carbon gas pricing systems or adopt one imposed by the federal government.
- April: JPMorgan Chase set a goal to finance $2.5 trillion over the following 10 years to combat climate change and advance sustainable development, and Citigroup said it would back $1 trillion of similar efforts by 2030. These announcement followed a similar one by Bank of America.
- 22–23 April: beginning on Earth Day, U. S. President Joe Biden hosted a virtual Leaders Summit on Climate attended by 40 world leaders, aiming to return the U.S. to being a leader in the global effort to reduce greenhouse gas emissions, which CNN called a "stark departure" from the Trump administration.
COP26: The Conference of the Parties...

21. Recognizes that the impacts of climate change will be much lower at the temperature increase of 1.5 °C compared with 2 °C and resolves to pursue efforts to limit the temperature increase to 1.5 °C;
22. Recognizes that limiting global warming to 1.5 °C requires rapid, deep and sustained reductions in global greenhouse gas emissions, including reducing global carbon dioxide emissions by 45 per cent by 2030 relative to the 2010 level and to net zero around mid-century, as well as deep reductions in other greenhouse gases;

— Glasgow Climate Pact
13 November 2021
- 29 April: Germany's Federal Constitutional Court unanimously ruled that the German government must set clear goals for reducing greenhouse gas emissions beyond 2030, stating that existing law placed too much of a burden on future generations to reduce greenhouse gas emissions.
- 12 May: The U.S. administration granted final approval to the nation's first large-scale offshore wind farm about 15 miles off the coast of Martha's Vineyard, Massachusetts, expected to generate 800 megawatts (enough to power about 400,000 homes), with an ultimate goal to deploy enough offshore wind turbines by 2030 to power 10 million homes. A June 7 article in The New York Times reported that Europe had 5,400 offshore wind turbines, compared to seven (7) in the United States.
- 28 May: court and shareholder actions succeeded against Shell Oil (Dutch court ordering Shell to cut emissions by 45% within 10 years), Exxon-Mobil (two climate activist hedge fund candidates receiving board positions), and Chevron (shareholders imposing emissions targets).
- 11–13 June: leaders at the 47th G7 summit reaffirmed their goal to limit global heating to 1.5 °C and promised to cut collective emissions in half by 2030, but did not clearly lay out a plan to raise $100 billion a year for poorer countries to adopt clean energy, and did not agree on a timeline to end use of coal for electric power.
- 24 June: the European Parliament approved a landmark law to make the EU's greenhouse gas emissions targets legally binding, setting targets to reduce net EU emissions by 55% by 2030 from 1990 levels and eliminate net emissions by 2050.
Conclusion on the Rights of Nature

The rights of nature protect ecosystems and natural processes for their intrinsic value, thus complementing them with the human right to a healthy and ecologically balanced environment. The rights of nature, like all constitutional rights, are justiciable and, consequently, judges are obliged to guarantee them.

— Constitutional Court of Ecuador
10 November 2021
- 15 July: the government of Greenland decided to cease issuing new licenses for oil and gas exploration "based upon economic calculations, but considerations of the impact on climate and the environment also play a central role in the decision".
- 18 August: a study published in Nature, considering the effect of ultraviolet radiation on the growth of plants serving as a carbon sink, estimated that the Montreal Protocol's late 1980s prohibition of ozone-depleting chemicals may have prevented an additional 115—235 parts per million of atmospheric CO_{2}, which might have led to a 0.50–1.0 °C increase in global average temperature by 2100.
- Mid-September: China began enforcing the Kigali Amendment (2016) to the Montreal Protocol, pledging to immediately stop emitting HFC-23, a greenhouse gas 14,600 times more powerful than carbon dioxide.
- 21 September: China announced it will stop funding overseas coal projects, estimated to affect 54 gigawatts, the cancellation averting about three months worth of global greenhouse gas emissions.
- 1–12 November: 2021 United Nations Climate Change Conference (COP26), postponed for a year because of the COVID-19 pandemic, takes place in Glasgow, Scotland, resulting in the Glasgow Climate Pact.
- 10 November: in a case involving mining in a protected region of the Ecuadorian rainforest, the Constitutional Court of Ecuador issued a landmark decision interpreting the country's constitutional provisions to grant rights and confer protections to ecosystems.
- 8 April 2022: the World Economic Forum reported that for the first time, wind and solar generated more than 10% of electricity globally in 2021, with fifty countries having crossed the 10% threshold. However, power from coal rose 9% to a new record high.

=== Mitigation goal statements ===
The emissions gap remains large:

Compared to previous unconditional Nationally Determined Contributions, the new pledges for 2030 reduce projected 2030 emissions by only 7.5 per cent, whereas 30 per cent (reduction) is needed for 2 °C and 55 per cent is needed for 1.5 °C.

- 27 January: newly elected U.S. President Joe Biden signed executive orders designed to put the country on a path to 100 percent carbon-free electricity by 2035 and net-zero greenhouse gas emissions by 2050.
- February: IBM pledged to have net-zero emissions by 2030 (cutting emissions by 65% by 2025 compared to 2010 levels), following similar pledges by Microsoft (to be "carbon negative" by 2030) and Amazon (net-zero by 2040).
- 21 April: co-legislators of the European Climate Law reached a provisional agreement on a key element of the European Green Deal, which the European Commission said "enshrines the EU's commitment to reaching climate neutrality by 2050 and the intermediate target of reducing net greenhouse gas emissions by at least 55% by 2030, compared to 1990 levels".
- 22 April: At the 2021 Leaders' Climate Summit on Earth Day, U.S. President Joe Biden announced a new target for the US, aiming to reduce greenhouse gas emissions by 50-52% by 2030 relative to 2005 levels.

=== Adaptation goal statements ===
- May: A Carbon Disclosure Project survey found that in 2020, about 43% of 800 surveyed cities (combined population: 400 million) did not have a climate adaptation plan.

== Public opinion and scientific consensus ==
Academic studies of scientific agreement on human-caused global warming among climate experts (2010–2015) reflect that the level of scientific consensus correlates with expertise in climate science. A 2019 study found scientific consensus to be at 100%, and a 2021 study concluded that consensus exceeded 99%. Another 2021 study found that 98.7% of climate experts indicated that the Earth is getting warmer mostly because of human activity.

Causation: Results of a public survey in 31 countries of public opinion, specifically among Facebook users, on the causes of climate change.

Perception of seriousness: Results of a public survey overseen by the United Nations Development Programme on belief in whether climate change presents a climate emergency.

- In January, the United Nations Development Programme released results of the Peoples Climate Vote (1.2 million respondents in over 50 countries), which found that 64% said that climate change was an emergency.
- In June, the Yale Program on Climate Change Communication and Facebook Data for Good jointly published International Public Opinion on Climate Change, describing beliefs, attitudes, policy preferences, and behaviors of Facebook users in 31 countries and territories worldwide, including knowledge and beliefs, perceived risks, support for government action, economic concerns, and activism.
- 19 October: based on a review of 3,000 peer-reviewed publications randomly chosen from a dataset of 88,125 published since 2012, a study published in Environmental Research Letters concluded with high statistical confidence that the scientific consensus on human-caused contemporary climate change exceeds 99% in the peer-reviewed scientific literature.

== Projections ==
The IPCC Sixth Assessment Report (2021) projects progressively large increases in both the frequency (horizontal bars) and intensity (vertical bars) of extreme weather events, for various degrees of global warming.

- 24 January, the World Economic Forum listed top 10 risks by likelihood (extreme weather as #1, climate action failure as #2, human environmental damage as #3) and by severity (climate action failure as #2, human environmental damage as #6, extreme weather as #8).
- 9 February: a Communications Earth & Environment article concluded that emissions reductions must increase by 80% beyond nationally determined contributions (NDCs) (from 1% to 1.8% per year) to meet the 2 °C target of the 2015 Paris Convention.
- 19 February: a study published in Geophysical Research Letters studied 1952–2011 data on the timing of seasons (Note: From Wang et al., Geophysical Research Letters: "We find that lengths and start dates of the four seasons have changed, and the changes will be amplified in the future. Over the period of 1952–2011, the length of summer increased from 78 to 95 days and that of spring, autumn and winter decreased from 124 to 115, 87 to 82, and 76 to 73 days, respectively.") and projected that, by 2100, summer in the northern mid-latitudes will last nearly half a year and winter will last less than 2 months.
- 8 March: a study published in Nature Geoscience concluded that "limiting global warming to 1.5 °C will prevent most of the tropics from reaching a TW (Note: "TW" focuses on wet-bulb temperature, which accounts for both temperature and humidity, and is similar to what is commonly known as heat index.) of 35 °C (95 °F), the limit of human adaptation".
- 16 March: the International Renewable Energy Agency's Outlook indicated that energy transition investment would have to increase by 30% over planned investment to a total of US$131 trillion between 2021 and 2050—$4.4 trillion/year—to meet 2050 CO_{2} reduction targets.
- 8 April: a study published in Geophysical Research Letters projected that limiting 21st-century warming to 2 °C will halve the Antarctic ice shelf area susceptible to collapsing and disintegrating, compared to the 34% of all Antarctic ice shelf loss projected for 4 °C warming.
- 9 April: a study published in Science Advances used higher resolution climate models that included modeling of ocean eddies, to project that global mean sea level rise at the end of this century would be about 25% lower than previous models.
- 20 April: a study accepted for publication in Environmental Research Letters concluded that immediately pursuing all presently available methane emission reduction measures could avoid 0.25 °C additional global mean warming by mid-century, and set a path to avoid more than 0.5 °C warming by 2100.
- 22 April: Swiss re-insurer Swiss Re forecast that, compared to growth levels without climate change, the world will have 11—14% less economic output (as much as $23 trillion less, annually) by 2050.
- 30 April: a study published in Science Advances projected that the positive feedback effect of crustal rebound as the West Antarctic Ice Sheet melts, (Note: Pan et al. explain that "this additional contribution to GMSL, as well as the rapid time scale in which it is reached, is a consequence of the unique setting of WAIS: The ice sheet is grounded on bedrock that is largely below local sea level, and it is underlain by an anomalously hot, low-viscosity mantle and thin lithosphere.") could cause an 18% amplification of the 21st century's global mean sea level (GMSL) rise, and 1 meter additional GMSL rise over the next millennium.
- 5 May: a study published in Nature projected that limiting global warming to 1.5 °C would reduce the land ice contribution to sea level rise by 2100 from 25 cm to 13 cm (from 10 to 6 in.), with glaciers responsible for half the sea level rise contribution.
- 5 May: a study published in Nature used an observationally calibrated ice sheet–shelf model to project that with 2 °C global warming, Antarctic ice loss will continue at its current pace; but that current policies would allow 3 °C warming and give an abrupt jump around 2060 to an order of magnitude increase in the rate of sea-level rise (to 0.5 cm/yr) by 2100.
- 5 May: a study accepted for publication in Environmental Research Letters reported that greenhouse gas emissions have heated the troposphere and cooled the stratosphere so that stratospheric thickness has shrunk over decades, and projected an additional thinning of 1.3 km by 2080 if Earth follows an RCP 6.0 scenario.
If pledges are met

Global warming at the end of the century is estimated at 2.7 °C if all unconditional 2030 pledges are fully implemented and 2.6 °C if all conditional pledges are also implemented. If the net-zero emissions pledges are additionally fully implemented, this estimate is lowered to around 2.2 °C.

— United Nations Emissions Gap Report
26 Oct 2021
- 5 May: The United Nations Environment Programme's Global Methane Assessment forecast that human-caused methane emissions can be reduced by up to 45 percent this decade and would avoid nearly 0.3 °C of global warming by 2045, and can be consistent with keeping the 1.5˚C goal for the century.
- May: Bloomberg NEF projected that by 2027, battery-powered electric vehicle prices would reach price parity with internal combustion engine vehicles in all light vehicle segments in Europe.
- 20 May: a study published in Nature Communications applied palaeoecological evidence (14,000–3600 years ago) to conclude that alpine areas actually developed less plant biodiversity with the upward advance of forest treelines, the researchers' simulation projecting a substantive decrease in plant biodiversity in response to global warming-related treeline rise.
- 20 May: the Arctic Monitoring and Assessment Programme reported climate models projecting that the probability of an ice-free Arctic summer is 10 times greater under a 2 °C global warming scenario compared with a 1.5 °C scenario.
- 26 May: an article published in the Proceedings of the National Academy of Sciences projected that under RCP 8.5 ("business as usual" scenario), the temperature experienced by an average human will change more in coming decades than over the past six millennia; the mean human-experienced temperature rise by 2070 will amount to an estimated 7.5 °C—about 2.3 times the mean global temperature rise; (Note: Xu et al. explain the discrepancy between human-experienced temperature rise and global average temperature rise "is largely due to the fact that the land will warm much faster than the oceans, but also ... that population growth is projected to be predominantly in hotter places.") and 3.5 billion people will be exposed to mean annual temperature ≥29.0 °C−presently found in 0.8% of the global land surface (mainly the Sahara) but projected to cover 19% of global land in 2070.
- 29 July: a study published in Nature Communications estimated that adding 4,434 metric tons of CO_{2}—the lifetime emissions of 3.5 average Americans—will cause one excess death globally between 2020 and 2100. The study included only heat-related mortality impacts, and not indirect impacts such as flooding, storms, and crop failures.

== Significant publications ==
Climate Change 2021:
The Physical Science Basis

[A.1] It is unequivocal that human influence has warmed the atmosphere, ocean and land. Widespread and rapid changes in the atmosphere, ocean, cryosphere and biosphere have occurred.
[A.3] Evidence of observed changes in extremes such as heatwaves, heavy precipitation, droughts, and tropical cyclones, and, in particular, their attribution to human influence, has strengthened since AR5 (2014).
[B.1] Global surface temperature will continue to increase until at least the mid-century under all emissions scenarios considered. Global warming of 1.5 °C and 2 °C will be exceeded during the 21st century unless deep reductions in CO2 and other greenhouse gas emissions occur in the coming decades.
[B.3] Continued global warming is projected to further intensify the global water cycle, including its variability, global monsoon precipitation and the severity of wet and dry events.
[B.5] Many changes due to past and future greenhouse gas emissions are irreversible for centuries to millennia, especially changes in the ocean, ice sheets and global sea level.
[D.2] Under these contrasting scenarios (low versus high greenhouse gas emissions), discernible differences in trends of global surface temperature would begin to emerge from natural variability within around 20 years, and over longer time periods for many other climatic impact-drivers.

— IPCC AR6 WGI "Summary for Policymakers" (9 Aug 2021)
- WGI AR6 (9 August 2021). "Climate Change 2021 / The Physical Science Basis / Working Group I contribution to the WGI Sixth Assessment Report of the Intergovernmental Panel on Climate Change" (PDF). IPCC.ch. Intergovernmental Panel on Climate Change. Archived (PDF) from the original on 9 August 2021. (Full report: >250MBytes; all 3,949 pages)

Link to Summary for Policymakers (41 pages)

- Fleming, Sean (19 January 2021). "These are the world's greatest threats in 2021". WEForum.org. World Economic Forum. Archived from the original on 20 January 2021.
- U.N. secretariat (26 February 2021). "Nationally determined contributions under the Paris Agreement — Synthesis Report (Advance Version)" (PDF). unfccc.int. United Nations. Archived (PDF) from the original on 26 February 2021.
- Office of the Director of National Intelligence (March 2021). "Global Trends 2040 - A More Contested World" (PDF). DNI.gov. National Intelligence Council. Archived (PDF) from the original on 11 April 2021.
- Zarnetske, Phoebe L.; Gurevitch, Jessica; Franklin, Janet; Groffman, Peter M.; Harrison, Cheryl S.; Hellmann, Jessica J.; Hoffman, Forrest M.; Kothari, Shan; Robock, Alan; Tilmes, Simone; Visioni, Daniele (13 April 2021). "Potential ecological impacts of climate intervention by reflecting sunlight to cool Earth". Proceedings of the National Academy of Sciences. 118 (15) e1921854118. Bibcode:2021PNAS..11821854Z. doi:10.1073/pnas.1921854118. ISSN 0027-8424. PMC 8053992. PMID 33876741.
- "Global Methane Assessment / Summary for Decision Makers / Executive Summary" (PDF). UNEP.org. United Nations Environment Programme. 5 May 2021. Archived (PDF) from the original on 10 August 2021.
- "The Role of Critical Minerals in Clean Energy Transitions / World Energy Outlook Special Report" (PDF). IEA.org. International Energy Agency. May 2021. Archived (PDF) from the original on 7 May 2021.
- "Net Zero by 2050 / A Roadmap for the Global Energy Sector" (PDF). IEA.org. International Energy Agency. 18 May 2021. Archived (PDF) from the original on 18 May 2021. (extract and archive thereof)
- AMAP Secretariat (20 May 2021). "Arctic Climate Change Update 2021: Key Trends and Impacts / Summary for Policy Makers". AMAP.no. Tromsø, Norway: Arctic Monitoring and Assessment Programme. Archived from the original on 20 May 2021.
- Sachs, Jeffrey D.; Kroll, Christian; Lafortune, Guillaume; Fulleer, Grayson; Woelm, Finn (June 2021). Sustainable Development Report 2021 / The Decade of Action for the Sustainable Development Goals (PDF). Cambridge, U.K.: Cambridge University Press. doi:10.1017/9781009106559. ISBN 978-1-009-10655-9. S2CID 236309770. Archived (PDF) from the original on 23 June 2021.
- Ripple, William J.; Wolf, Christopher; Newsome, Thomas M.; Gregg, Jillian W.; et al. (28 July 2021). "World Scientists' Warning of a Climate Emergency 2021". BioScience. 71 (9) biab079. doi:10.1093/biosci/biab079. hdl:10871/126814. ISSN 0006-3568.
- Blunden, J.; Boyer, T. (August 2021). Blunden, J.; Boyer, T. (eds.). "State of the Climate in 2020" (PDF). Bulletin of the American Meteorological Society. 102 (8): S1–S475. Bibcode:2021BAMS..102Q...1B. doi:10.1175/2021BAMSStateoftheClimate.1. S2CID 238760782. (Executive Summary)
- WMO Atlas of Mortality and Economic Losses from Weather, Climate and Water Extremes (1970–2019). Geneva: World Meteorological Organization (WMO). August 2021. ISBN 978-92-63-11267-5. Archived from the original on 1 September 2021. (WMO-No. 1267; 90 pp).
- "The Sixth Status of Corals of the World: 2020 Report". GCRMN.net. Global Coral Reef Monitoring Network. October 2021. Archived from the original on 5 October 2021.
- "State of the Climate in Africa 2020 (WMO-No. 1275)". WMO.int. World Meteorological Organization. 19 October 2021. Archived from the original on 19 October 2021.
- "National Intelligence Estimate / Climate Change and International Responses Increasing Challenges to US National Security Through 2040 (NIC-NIE-2021-10030-A)" (PDF). DNI.gov. National Intelligence Council. 21 October 2021. Archived (PDF) from the original on 21 October 2021.
- UNEP, UNEP DTU Partnership (26 October 2021). "Emissions Gap Report 2021" (PDF). UNEP.org. United Nations Environment Programme (UNEP). Archived (PDF) from the original on 27 October 2021.
- "State of Climate in 2021: Extreme events and major impacts (Press Release Number: 31102021)". WMO.int. World Meteorological Organization. 31 October 2021.
- Washington Post Staff (13 November 2021). "The Glasgow climate pact, annotated". The Washington Post. Archived from the original on 14 November 2021.
- "State of the Global Climate 2021". WMO.int. World Meteorological Organization (WMO-No. 1290). 18 May 2022. Archived from the original on 18 May 2022.

== See also ==
- 2021 in the environment and environmental sciences
- Climatology § History
- History of climate change policy and politics
- History of climate change science
- Politics of climate change § History
- Timeline of sustainable energy research 2020–present
