= Permafrost carbon cycle =

Sub-cycle of the larger global carbon cycle

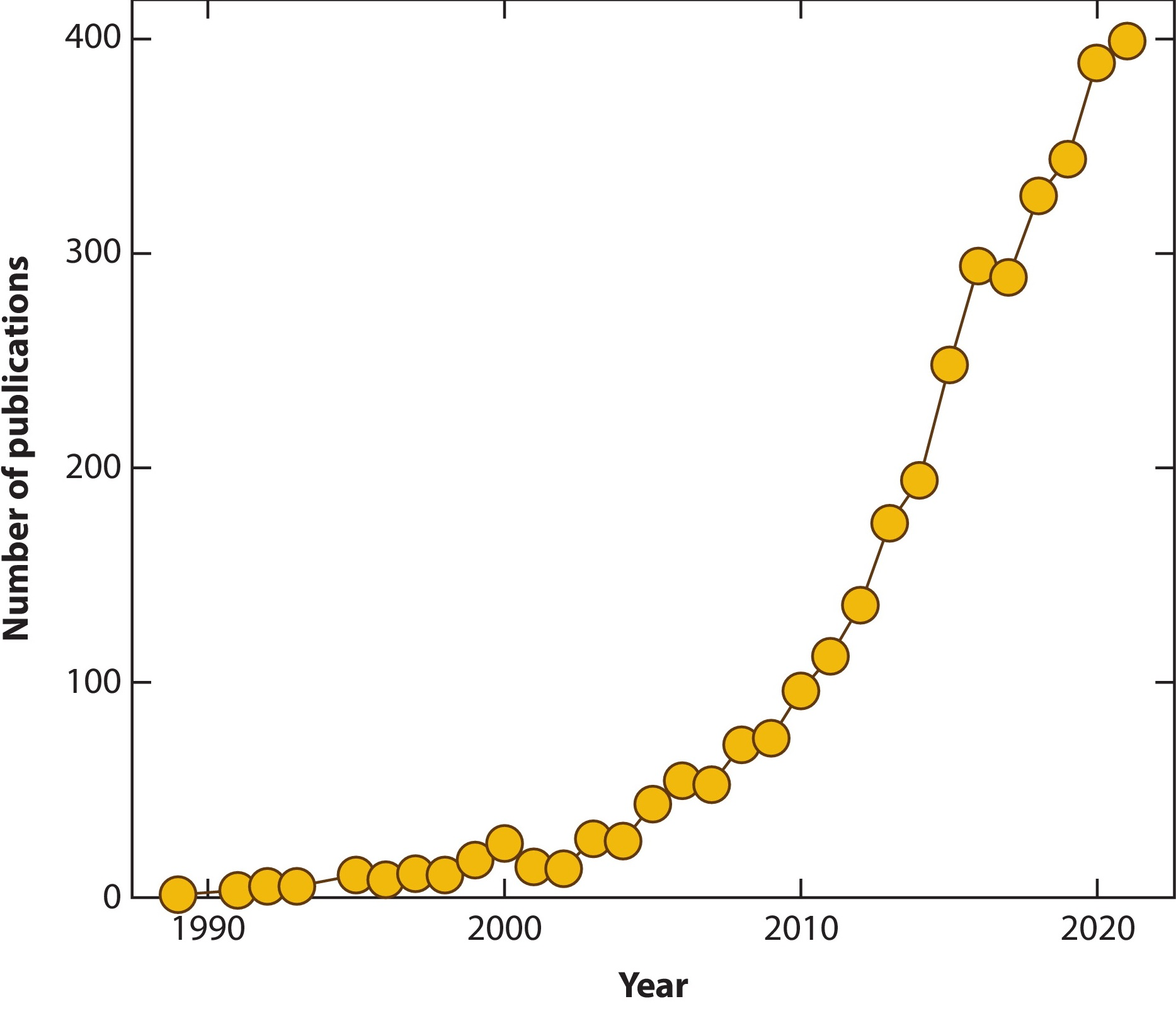
The annual number of scientific research papers published on the subject of permafrost carbon has grown from next to nothing around 1990 to around 400 by 2020.

The permafrost carbon cycle or Arctic carbon cycle is a sub-cycle of the larger global carbon cycle. Permafrost is defined as subsurface material that remains below 0^{o} C (32^{o} F) for at least two consecutive years. Because permafrost soils remain frozen for long periods of time, they store large amounts of carbon and other nutrients within their frozen framework during that time. Permafrost represents a large carbon reservoir, one which was often neglected in the initial research determining global terrestrial carbon reservoirs. Since the start of the 2000s, however, far more attention has been paid to the subject, with an enormous growth both in general attention and in the scientific research output.

The permafrost carbon cycle deals with the transfer of carbon from permafrost soils to terrestrial vegetation and microbes, to the atmosphere, back to vegetation, and, finally, back to permafrost soils through burial and sedimentation due to cryogenic processes. Some of this carbon is transferred to the ocean and other portions of the globe through the global carbon cycle. The cycle includes the exchange of carbon dioxide and methane between terrestrial components and the atmosphere, as well as the transfer of carbon between land and water as methane, dissolved organic carbon, dissolved inorganic carbon, particulate inorganic carbon, and particulate organic carbon.

== Storage ==
Soils, in general, are the largest reservoirs of carbon in terrestrial ecosystems. This is also true for soils in the Arctic that are underlain by permafrost. In 2003, Tarnocai, et al. used the Northern and Mid Latitudes Soil Database to make a determination of carbon stocks in cryosols—soils containing permafrost within two meters of the soil surface. Permafrost affected soils cover nearly 9% of the Earth's land area, yet store between 25 and 50% of the soil organic carbon. These estimates show that permafrost soils are an important carbon pool. These soils not only contain large amounts of carbon, but also sequester carbon through cryoturbation and cryogenic processes.

=== Processes ===
Carbon is not produced by permafrost. Organic carbon derived from terrestrial vegetation must be incorporated into the soil column and subsequently be incorporated into permafrost to be effectively stored. Because permafrost responds to climate changes slowly, carbon storage removes carbon from the atmosphere for long periods of time. Radiocarbon dating techniques reveal that carbon within permafrost is often thousands of years old. Carbon storage in permafrost is the result of two primary processes.

- The first process that captures carbon and stores it is syngenetic permafrost growth. This process is the result of a constant active layer where thickness and energy exchange between permafrost, active layer, biosphere, and atmosphere, resulting in the vertical increase of the soil surface elevation. This aggradation of soil is the result of aeolian or fluvial sedimentation and/or peat formation. Peat accumulation rates are as high as 0.5mm/yr while sedimentation may cause a rise of 0.7mm/yr. Thick silt deposits resulting from abundant loess deposition during the Last Glacial Maximum form thick carbon-rich soils known as yedoma. As this process occurs, the organic and mineral soil that is deposited is incorporated into the permafrost as the permafrost surface rises.
- The second process responsible for storing carbon is cryoturbation, the mixing of soil due to freeze-thaw cycles. Cryoturbation moves carbon from the surface to depths within the soil profile. Frost heaving is the most common form of cryoturbation. Eventually, carbon that originates at the surface moves deep enough into the active layer to be incorporated into permafrost. When cryoturbation and the deposition of sediments act together carbon storage rates increase.

=== Current estimates ===
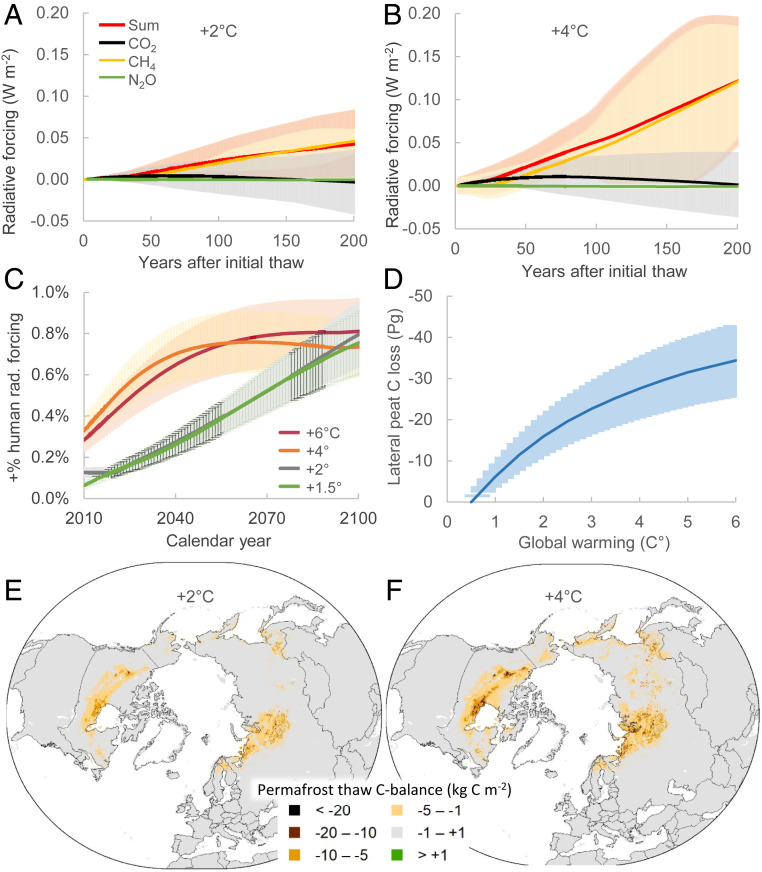
Permafrost peatlands under varying extent of global warming, and the resultant emissions as a fraction of anthropogenic emissions needed to cause that extent of warming.

It is estimated that the total soil organic carbon (SOC) stock in northern circumpolar permafrost region equals around 1,460–1,600 Pg. (1 Pg = 1 Gt = 10^{15}g) With the Tibetan Plateau carbon content included, the total carbon pools in the permafrost of the Northern Hemisphere is likely to be around 1832 Gt. This estimation of the amount of carbon stored in permafrost soils is more than double the amount currently in the atmosphere.

Soil column in the permafrost soils is generally broken into three horizons, 0–30 cm, 0–100 cm, and 1–300 cm. The uppermost horizon (0–30 cm) contains approximately 200 Pg of organic carbon. The 0–100 cm horizon contains an estimated 500 Pg of organic carbon, and the 0–300 cm horizon contains an estimated 1024 Pg of organic carbon. These estimates more than doubled the previously known carbon pools in permafrost soils. Additional carbon stocks exist in yedoma (400 Pg), carbon rich loess deposits found throughout Siberia and isolated regions of North America, and deltaic deposits (240 Pg) throughout the Arctic. These deposits are generally deeper than the 3 m investigated in traditional studies. Many concerns arise because of the large amount of carbon stored in permafrost soils. Until recently, the amount of carbon present in permafrost was not taken into account in climate models and global carbon budgets.

== Carbon release from the permafrost ==
Carbon is continually cycling between soils, vegetation, and the atmosphere. As climate change increases mean annual air temperatures throughout the Arctic, it extends permafrost thaw and deepens the active layer, exposing old carbon that has been in storage for decades to millennia to biogenic processes which facilitate its entrance into the atmosphere. In general, the volume of permafrost in the upper 3 m of ground is expected to decrease by about 25% per 1 °C (1.8 °F)of global warming. According to the IPCC Sixth Assessment Report, there is high confidence that global warming over the last few decades has led to widespread increases in permafrost temperature. Observed warming was up to 3 °C (5.4 °F) in parts of Northern Alaska (early 1980s to mid-2000s) and up to 2 °C (3.6 °F) in parts of the Russian European North (1970–2020), and active layer thickness has increased in the European and Russian Arctic across the 21st century and at high elevation areas in Europe and Asia since the 1990s. In Yukon, the zone of continuous permafrost might have moved 100 kilometres (62 mi) poleward since 1899, but accurate records only go back 30 years. Based on high agreement across model projections, fundamental process understanding, and paleoclimate evidence, it is virtually certain that permafrost extent and volume will continue to shrink as global climate warms.

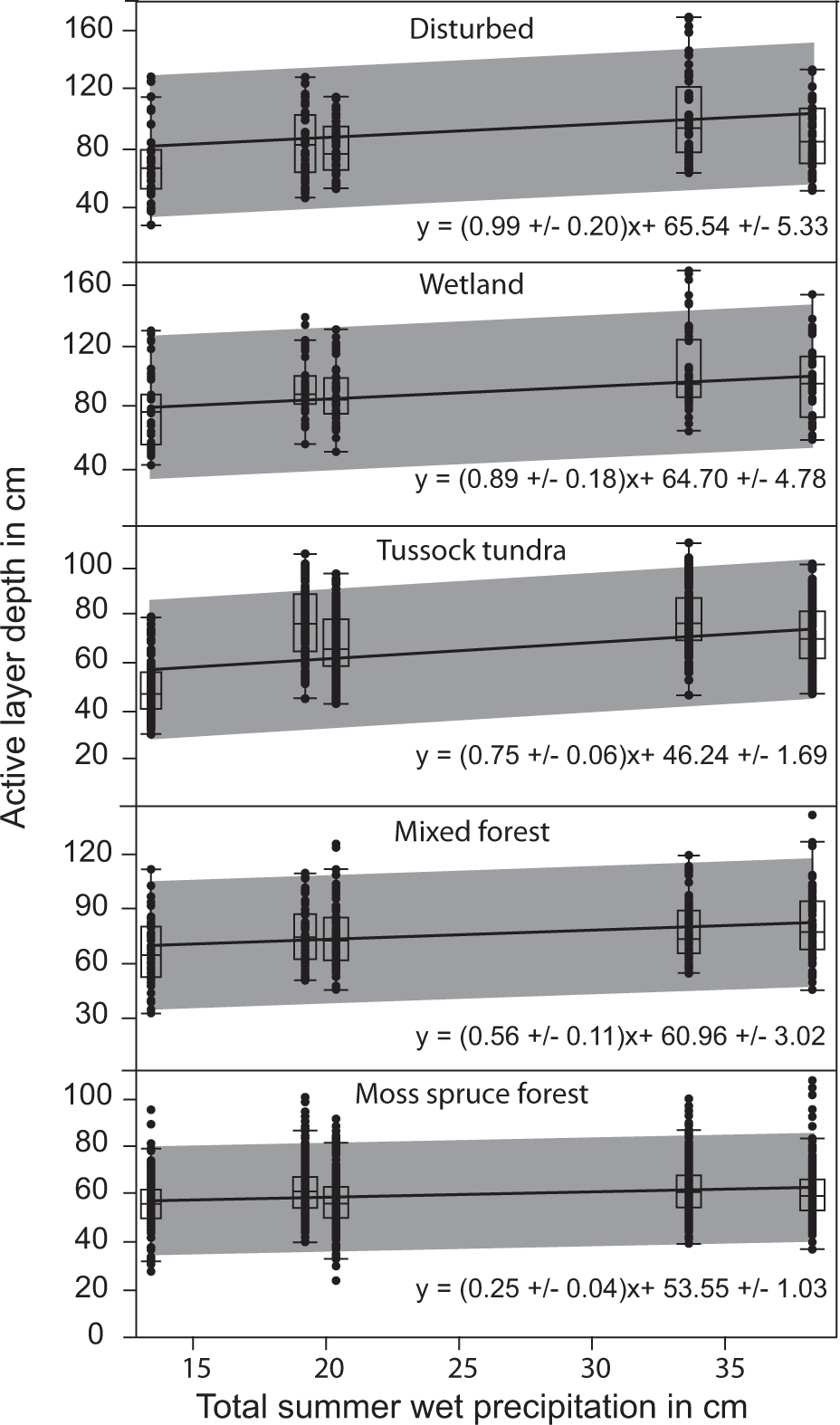
Greater summer precipitation increases the depth of permafrost layer subject to thaw, in different Arctic permafrost environments.

Carbon emissions from permafrost thaw contribute to the same warming which facilitates the thaw, making it a positive climate change feedback. The warming also intensifies Arctic water cycle, and the increased amounts of warmer rain are another factor which increases permafrost thaw depths. The amount of carbon that will be released from warming conditions depends on depth of thaw, carbon content within the thawed soil, physical changes to the environment and microbial and vegetation activity in the soil. Microbial respiration is the primary process through which old permafrost carbon is re-activated and enters the atmosphere. The rate of microbial decomposition within organic soils, including thawed permafrost, depends on environmental controls, such as soil temperature, moisture availability, nutrient availability, and oxygen availability. In particular, sufficient concentrations of iron oxides in some permafrost soils can inhibit microbial respiration and prevent carbon mobilization: however, this protection only lasts until carbon is separated from the iron oxides by Fe-reducing bacteria, which is only a matter of time under the typical conditions. Depending on the soil type, Iron(III) oxide can boost oxidation of methane to carbon dioxide in the soil, but it can also amplify methane production by acetotrophs: these soil processes are not yet fully understood.

Altogether, the likelihood of the entire carbon pool mobilizing and entering the atmosphere is low despite the large volumes stored in the soil. Although temperatures will increase, this does not imply complete loss of permafrost and mobilization of the entire carbon pool. Much of the ground underlain by permafrost will remain frozen even if warming temperatures increase the thaw depth or increase thermokarsting and permafrost degradation. Moreover, other elements such as iron and aluminum can adsorb some of the mobilized soil carbon before it reaches the atmosphere, and they are particularly prominent in the mineral sand layers which often overlay permafrost. On the other hand, once the permafrost area thaws, it will not go back to being permafrost for centuries even if the temperature increase reversed, making it one of the best-known examples of tipping points in the climate system.

A 1993 study suggested that while the tundra was a carbon sink until the end of the 1970s, it had already transitioned to a net carbon source by the time the study concluded. The 2019 Arctic Report Card estimated that Arctic permafrost releases between 0.3 and 0.6 Pg C per year. That same year, a study settled on the 0.6 Pg C figure, as the net difference between the annual emissions of 1,66 Pg C during the winter season (October–April), and the model-estimated vegetation carbon uptake of 1 Pg C during the growing season. It estimated that under RCP 8.5, a scenario of continually accelerating greenhouse gas emissions, winter CO_{2} emissions from the northern permafrost domain would increase 41% by 2100. Under the "intermediate" scenario RCP 4.5, where greenhouse gas emissions peak and plateau within the next two decades, before gradually declining for the rest of the century (a rate of mitigation deeply insufficient to meet the Paris Agreement goals) permafrost carbon emissions would increase by 17%. In 2022, this was challenged by a study which used a record of atmospheric observations between 1980 and 2017, and found that permafrost regions have been gaining carbon on net, as process-based models underestimated net CO_{2} uptake in the permafrost regions and overestimated it in the forested regions, where increased respiration in response to warming offsets more of the gains than was previously understood.

Notably, estimates of carbon release alone do not fully represent the impact of permafrost thaw on climate change. This is because carbon can either be released as carbon dioxide (CO_{2}) or methane (CH_{4}). Aerobic respiration releases carbon dioxide, while anaerobic respiration releases methane. This is a substantial difference, as while biogenic methane lasts less than 12 years in the atmosphere, its global warming potential is around 80 times larger than that of CO_{2} over a 20-year period and between 28 and 40 times larger over a 100-year period.

=== Carbon dioxide emissions ===
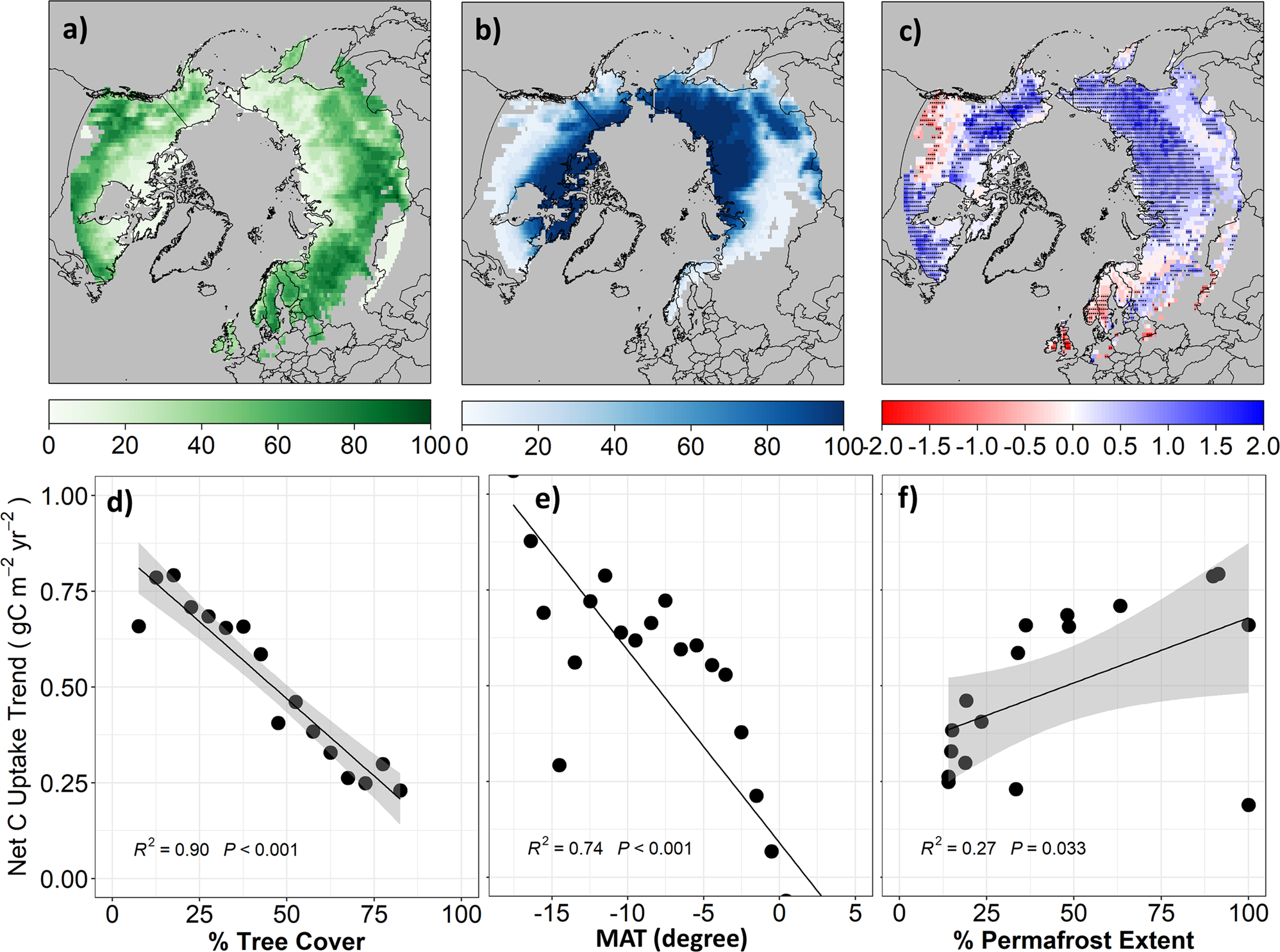
Recent observations suggest that CO_{2} absorption had been increasing at a faster rate over the areas with a lot of permafrost and limited tree cover than over the areas with extensive tree cover.

Most of the permafrost soil are oxic and provide a suitable environment for aerobic microbial respiration. As such, carbon dioxide emissions account for the overwhelming majority of permafrost emissions and of the Arctic emissions in general. There's some debate over whether the observed emissions from permafrost soils primarily constitute microbial respiration of ancient carbon, or simply greater respiration of modern-day carbon (i.e. leaf litter), due to warmer soils intensifying microbial metabolism. Studies published in the early 2020s indicate that while soil microbiota still primarily consumes and respires modern carbon when plants grow during the spring and summer, these microorganisms then sustain themselves on ancient carbon during the winter, releasing it into the atmosphere.

On the other hand, former permafrost areas consistently see increased vegetation growth, or primary production, as plants can set down deeper roots in the thawed soil and grow larger and uptake more carbon. This is generally the main counteracting feedback on permafrost carbon emissions. However, in areas with streams and other waterways, more of their leaf litter enters those waterways, increasing their dissolved organic carbon content. Leaching of soil organic carbon from permafrost soils is also accelerated by warming climate and by erosion along river and stream banks freeing the carbon from the previously frozen soil. Moreover, thawed areas become more vulnerable to wildfires, which alter landscape and release large quantities of stored organic carbon through combustion. As these fires burn, they remove organic matter from the surface. Removal of the protective organic mat that insulates the soil exposes the underlying soil and permafrost to increased solar radiation, which in turn increases the soil temperature, active layer thickness, and changes soil moisture. Changes in the soil moisture and saturation alter the ratio of oxic to anoxic decomposition within the soil.

A hypothesis promoted by Sergey Zimov is that the reduction of herds of large herbivores has increased the ratio of energy emission and energy absorption tundra (energy balance) in a manner that increases the tendency for net thawing of permafrost. He is testing this hypothesis in an experiment at Pleistocene Park, a nature reserve in northeastern Siberia. On the other hand, warming allows the beavers to extend their habitat further north, where their dams impair boat travel, impact access to food, affect water quality, and endanger downstream fish populations. Pools formed by the dams store heat, thus changing local hydrology and causing localized permafrost thaw.

=== Methane emissions ===
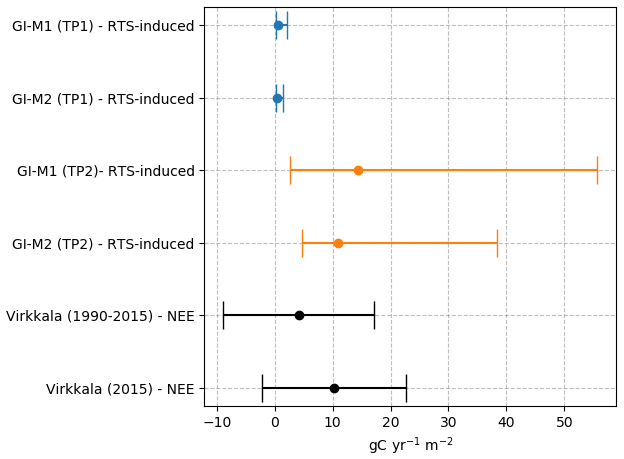
Carbon cycle accelerates in the wake of abrupt thaw (orange) relative to the previous state of the area (blue, black).

Global warming in the Arctic accelerates methane release from both existing stores and methanogenesis in rotting biomass. Methanogenesis requires thoroughly anaerobic environments, which slow down the mobilization of old carbon. A 2015 Nature review estimated that the cumulative emissions from thawed anaerobic permafrost sites were 75–85% lower than the cumulative emissions from aerobic sites, and that even there, methane emissions amounted to only 3 to 7% of CO_{2} emitted in situ (by weight of carbon). While they represented 25 to 45% of the CO_{2}'s potential impact on climate over a 100-year timescale, the review concluded that aerobic permafrost thaw still had a greater warming impact overall. In 2018, however, another study in Nature Climate Change performed seven-year incubation experiments and found that methane production became equivalent to CO_{2} production once a methanogenic microbial community became established at the anaerobic site. This finding had substantially raised the overall warming impact represented by anaerobic thaw sites.

Since methanogenesis requires anaerobic environments, it is frequently associated with Arctic lakes, where the emergence of bubbles of methane can be observed. Lakes produced by the thaw of particularly ice-rich permafrost are known as thermokarst lakes. Not all of the methane produced in the sediment of a lake reaches the atmosphere, as it can get oxidized in the water column or even within the sediment itself. 2022 observations indicate that at least half of the methane produced within thermokarst lakes reaches the atmosphere. Another process which frequently results in substantial methane emissions is the erosion of permafrost-stabilized hillsides and their ultimate collapse. Altogether, these two processes - hillside collapse (also known as retrogressive thaw slump, or RTS) and thermokarst lake formation - are collectively described as abrupt thaw, as they can rapidly expose substantial volumes of soil to microbial respiration in a matter of days, as opposed to the gradual, cm by cm, thaw of formerly frozen soil which dominates across most permafrost environments. This rapidity was illustrated in 2019, when three permafrost sites which would have been safe from thawing under the "intermediate" Representative Concentration Pathway 4.5 for 70 more years had undergone abrupt thaw. Another example occurred in the wake of a 2020 Siberian heatwave, which was found to have increased RTS numbers 17-fold across the northern Taymyr Peninsula – from 82 to 1404, while the resultant soil carbon mobilization increased 28-fold, to an average of 11 grams of carbon per square meter per year across the peninsula (with a range between 5 and 38 grams).

Until recently, Permafrost carbon feedback (PCF) modeling had mainly focused on gradual permafrost thaw, due to the difficulty of modelling abrupt thaw, and because of the flawed assumptions about the rates of methane production. Nevertheless, a study from 2018, by using field observations, radiocarbon dating, and remote sensing to account for thermokarst lakes, determined that abrupt thaw will more than double permafrost carbon emissions by 2100. And a second study from 2020, showed that under the scenario of continually accelerating emissions (RCP 8.5), abrupt thaw carbon emissions across 2.5 million km^{2} are projected to provide the same feedback as gradual thaw of near-surface permafrost across the whole 18 million km^{2} it occupies. Thus, abrupt thaw adds between 60 and 100 gigatonnes of carbon by 2300, increasing carbon emissions by ~125–190% when compared to gradual thaw alone.

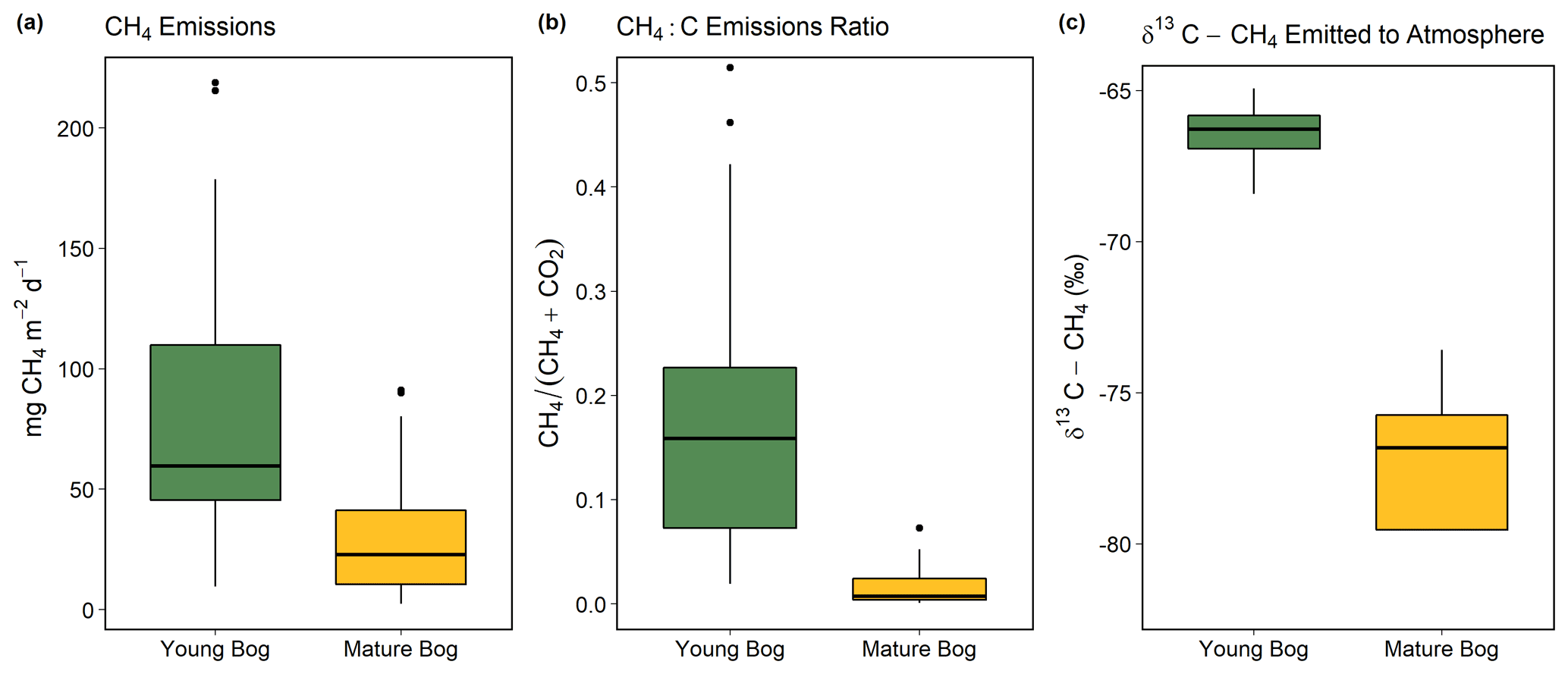
Methane emissions from thawed permafrost appear to decrease as bog matures over time.

However, there is still scientific debate about the rate and the trajectory of methane production in the thawed permafrost environments. For instance, a 2017 paper suggested that even in the thawing peatlands with frequent thermokarst lakes, less than 10% of methane emissions can be attributed to the old, thawed carbon, and the rest is anaerobic decomposition of modern carbon. A follow-up study in 2018 had even suggested that increased uptake of carbon due to rapid peat formation in the thermokarst wetlands would compensate for the increased methane release. Another 2018 paper suggested that permafrost emissions are limited following thermokarst thaw, but are substantially greater in the aftermath of wildfires. In 2022, a paper demonstrated that peatland methane emissions from permafrost thaw are initially quite high (82 milligrams of methane per square meter per day), but decline by nearly three times as the permafrost bog matures, suggesting a reduction in methane emissions in several decades to a century following abrupt thaw.

=== Subsea permafrost ===
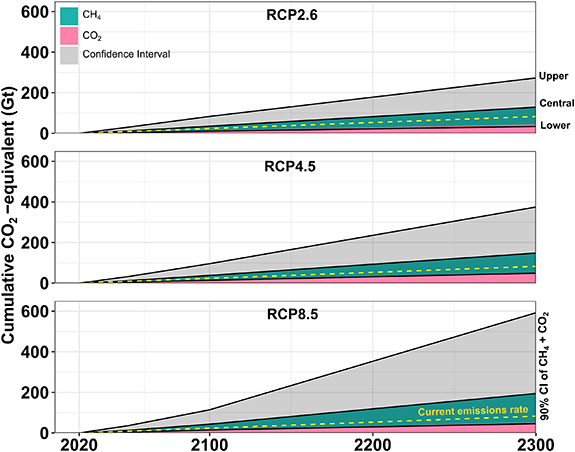
Carbon dioxide and methane (in CO_{2} equivalent) emissions from subsea permafrost alone under the different Representative Concentration Pathway scenarios over time.

Subsea permafrost occurs beneath the seabed and exists in the continental shelves of the polar regions. Thus, it can be defined as "the unglaciated continental shelf areas exposed during the Last Glacial Maximum (LGM, ~26 500 BP) that are currently inundated". Large stocks of organic matter (OM) and methane (CH_{4}) are accumulated below and within the subsea permafrost deposits.This source of methane is different from methane clathrates, but contributes to the overall outcome and feedbacks in the Earth's climate system.

The size of today's subsea permafrost has been estimated at 2 million km^{2} (~1/5 of the terrestrial permafrost domain size), which constitutes a 30–50% reduction since the LGM. Containing around 560 GtC in OM and 45 GtC in CH_{4}, with a current release of 18 and 38 MtC per year respectively, which is due to the warming and thawing that the subsea permafrost domain has been experiencing since after the LGM (~14000 years ago). In fact, because the subsea permafrost systems responds at millennial timescales to climate warming, the current carbon fluxes it is emitting to the water are in response to climatic changes occurring after the LGM. Therefore, human-driven climate change effects on subsea permafrost will only be seen hundreds or thousands of years from today. According to predictions under a business-as-usual emissions scenario RCP 8.5, by 2100, 43 GtC could be released from the subsea permafrost domain, and 190 GtC by the year 2300. Whereas for the low emissions scenario RCP 2.6, 30% less emissions are estimated. This constitutes a significant anthropogenic-driven acceleration of carbon release in the upcoming centuries.

=== Cumulative ===
In 2011, preliminary computer analyses suggested that permafrost emissions could be equivalent to around 15% of anthropogenic emissions.

A 2018 perspectives article discussing tipping points in the climate system activated around 2 °C (3.6 °F) of global warming suggested that at this threshold, permafrost thaw would add a further 0.09 °C (0.16 °F) to global temperatures by 2100, with a range of 0.04–0.16 °C (0.072–0.288 °F) In 2021, another study estimated that in a future where zero emissions were reached following an emission of a further 1000 Pg C into the atmosphere (a scenario where temperatures ordinarily stay stable after the last emission, or start to decline slowly) permafrost carbon would add 0.06 °C (0.11 °F) (with a range of 0.02–0.14 °C (0.036–0.252 °F)) 50 years after the last anthropogenic emission, 0.09 °C (0.16 °F) (0.04–0.21 °C (0.072–0.378 °F)) 100 years later and 0.27 °C (0.49 °F) (0.12–0.49 °C (0.22–0.88 °F)) 500 years later. However, neither study was able to take abrupt thaw into account.

In 2020, a study of the northern permafrost peatlands (a smaller subset of the entire permafrost area, covering 3.7 million km^{2} out of the estimated 18 million km^{2}) would amount to ~1% of anthropogenic radiative forcing by 2100, and that this proportion remains the same in all warming scenarios considered, from 1.5 °C (2.7 °F) to 6 °C (11 °F). It had further suggested that after 200 more years, those peatlands would have absorbed more carbon than what they had emitted into the atmosphere.

The IPCC Sixth Assessment Report estimates that carbon dioxide and methane released from permafrost could amount to the equivalent of 14–175 billion tonnes of carbon dioxide per 1 °C (1.8 °F) of warming. For comparison, by 2019, annual anthropogenic emission of carbon dioxide alone stood around 40 billion tonnes.

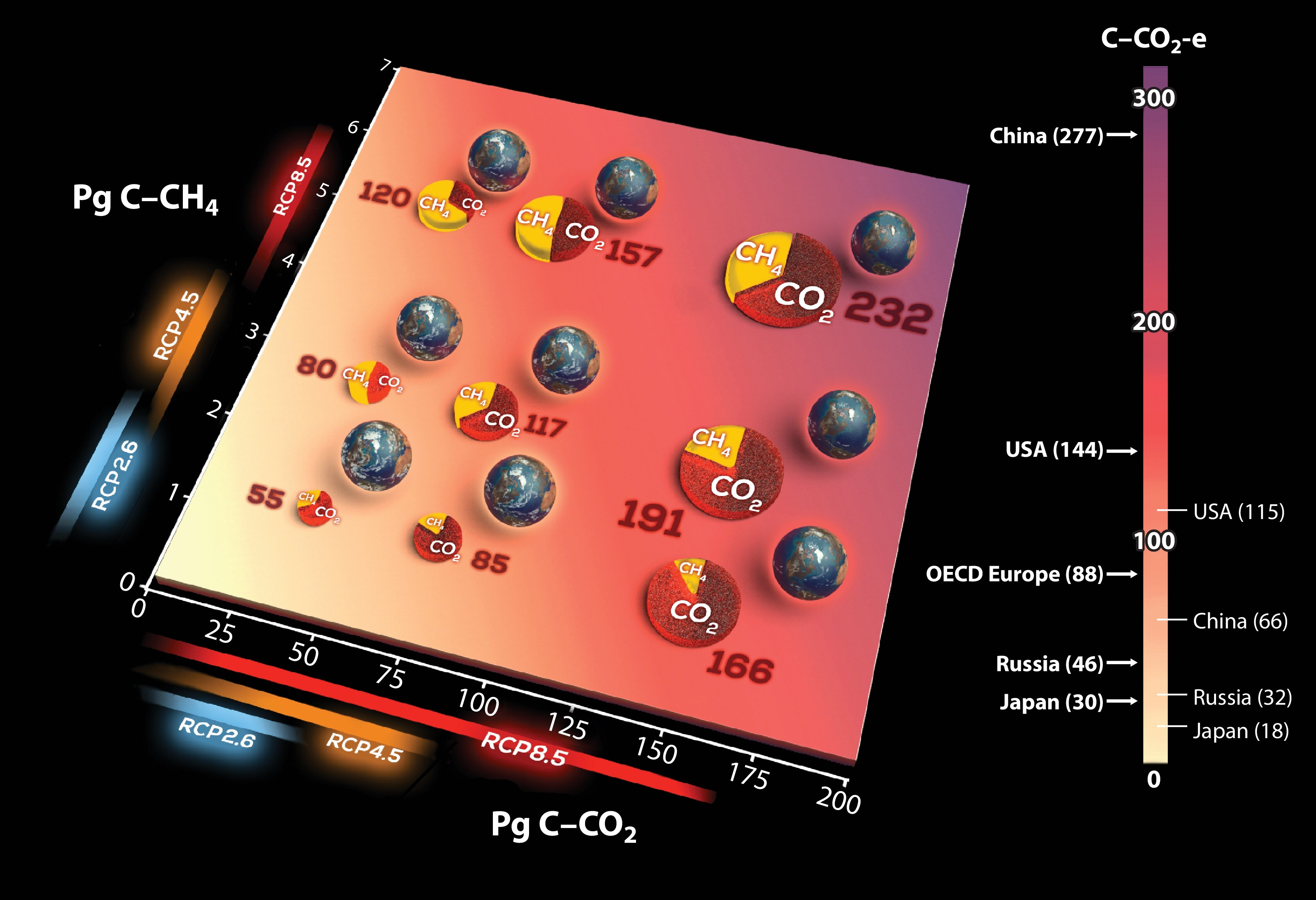
Nine probable scenarios of greenhouse gas emissions from permafrost thaw during the 21st century, which show a limited, moderate and intense CO_{2} and CH_{4} emission response to low, medium and high-emission Representative Concentration Pathways. The vertical bar uses emissions of selected large countries as a comparison: the right-hand side of the scale shows their cumulative emissions since the start of the Industrial Revolution, while the left-hand side shows each country's cumulative emissions for the rest of the 21st century if they remained unchanged from their 2019 levels.

A 2021 assessment of the economic impact of climate tipping points estimated that permafrost carbon emissions would increase the social cost of carbon by about 8.4% However, the methods of that assessment have attracted controversy: when researchers like Steve Keen and Timothy Lenton had accused it of underestimating the overall impact of tipping points and of higher levels of warming in general, the authors have conceded some of their points.

In 2021, a group of prominent permafrost researchers like Merritt Turetsky had presented their collective estimate of permafrost emissions, including the abrupt thaw processes, as part of an effort to advocate for a 50% reduction in anthropogenic emissions by 2030 as a necessary milestone to help reach net zero by 2050. Their figures for combined permafrost emissions by 2100 amounted to 150–200 billion tonnes of carbon dioxide equivalent under 1.5 °C (2.7 °F) of warming, 220–300 billion tonnes under 2 °C (3.6 °F) and 400–500 billion tonnes if the warming was allowed to exceed 4 °C (7.2 °F). They compared those figures to the extrapolated present-day emissions of Canada, the European Union and the United States or China, respectively. The 400–500 billion tonnes figure would also be equivalent to the today's remaining budget for staying within a 1.5 °C (2.7 °F) target. One of the scientists involved in that effort, Susan M. Natali of Woods Hole Research Centre, had also led the publication of a complementary estimate in a PNAS paper that year, which suggested that when the amplification of permafrost emissions by abrupt thaw and wildfires is combined with the foreseeable range of near-future anthropogenic emissions, avoiding the exceedance (or "overshoot") of 1.5 °C (2.7 °F) warming is already implausible, and the efforts to attain it may have to rely on negative emissions to force the temperature back down.

An updated 2022 assessment of climate tipping points concluded that abrupt permafrost thaw would add 50% to gradual thaw rates, and would add 14 billion tons of carbon dioxide equivalent emissions by 2100 and 35 billion tons by 2300 per every degree of warming. This would have a warming impact of 0.04 °C (0.072 °F) per every full degree of warming by 2100, and 0.11 °C (0.20 °F) per every full degree of warming by 2300. It also suggested that at between 3 °C (5.4 °F) and 6 °C (11 °F) degrees of warming (with the most likely figure around 4 °C (7.2 °F) degrees) a large-scale collapse of permafrost areas could become irreversible, adding between 175 and 350 billion tons of CO_{2} equivalent emissions, or 0.2–0.4 °C (0.36–0.72 °F) degrees, over about 50 years (with a range between 10 and 300 years).

A major review published in the year 2022 concluded that if the goal of preventing 2 °C (3.6 °F) of warming was realized, then the average annual permafrost emissions throughout the 21st century would be equivalent to the year 2019 annual emissions of Russia. Under RCP4.5, a scenario considered close to the current trajectory and where the warming stays slightly below 3 °C (5.4 °F), annual permafrost emissions would be comparable to year 2019 emissions of Western Europe or the United States, while under the scenario of high global warming and worst-case permafrost feedback response, they would nearly match year 2019 emissions of China.

== See also ==
- Fire and carbon cycling in boreal forests
- Carbon cycle

== Sources ==
- IPCC (2021). Masson-Delmotte, V.; Zhai, P.; Pirani, A.; Connors, S. L.; et al. (eds.). Climate Change 2021: The Physical Science Basis (PDF). Contribution of Working Group I to the Sixth Assessment Report of the Intergovernmental Panel on Climate Change. Cambridge University Press (In Press).
