= Phoebe L. Zarnetske =

American community ecologist and associate professor

Phoebe Lehmann Zarnetske
- Education: Oregon State University (Ph.D.); Utah State University (MSc.); Colby College (B.A.)
- Scientific career
- Institutions: Michigan State University
- Thesis: The influence of biophysical feedbacks and species interactions on grass invasions and coastal dune morphology in the Pacific Northwest, USA (2011)
- Website: https://www.communityecologylab.com/

Phoebe L. Zarnetske is a community ecologist and associate professor at Michigan State University. She is a core faculty member in the Ecology, Evolution, and Behavior (EEB) Program there. Her work focuses on the ecological and evolutionary mechanisms that shape natural communities across multiple spatial scales.

== Education and career ==
Zarnetske received her B.A. in biology with a concentration in environmental science from Colby College in 2001. She received her M.S. in ecology at Utah State University in 2006. In 2011, she earned a Ph.D. from Oregon State University. She was a Graduate Fellow National State Foundation's Integrative Graduate Education and Research Traineeship (IGERT) Ecosystem Informatics. She also was a Postdoctoral Fellow, Yale Climate and Energy Institute at Yale University from 2011-2013. In 2013, Zarnetske joined Michigan State University, and was promoted to associate professor in the Department of Integrative Biology in 2020.

== Research ==
Zarnetske research interests center on examining how ecological communities respond to climate change and invasive species. Her Ph.D. research examined feedbacks between grass invasions and the shape of dunes. She has contributed to our understanding of how climate change impacts species and communities and described the biotic multipliers of climate change by considering which species are most likely to be under threat. Zarnetske has contributed to the field of spatial and community ecology by examining the effect of biotic interactions and environmental conditions on the spread of non-native species and their impact on resident communities. Zarnetske and Jessica Gurevitch lead the Climate Intervention Biology Working Group which gathers scientists working at the intersection of climate research and ecology, and in 2021 Zarnetske led a publication in the Proceedings of the National Academy of Sciences presenting knowledge gaps on the ecological impacts of Stratospheric aerosol injection on the natural world.

=== Selected publications ===
- Zarnetske, Phoebe L.; Hacker, Sally D.; Seabloom, Eric W.; Ruggiero, Peter; Killian, Jason R.; Maddux, Timothy B.; Cox, Daniel (2012). "Biophysical feedback mediates effects of invasive grasses on coastal dune shape". Ecology. 93 (6): 1439–1450. doi:10.1890/11-1112.1. ISSN 1939-9170. PMID 22834384.
- Blois, J. L.; Zarnetske, P. L.; Fitzpatrick, M. C.; Finnegan, S. (2 August 2013). "Climate Change and the Past, Present, and Future of Biotic Interactions". Science. 341 (6145): 499–504. Bibcode:2013Sci...341..499B. doi:10.1126/science.1237184. PMID 23908227. S2CID 5819828.
- Zarnetske, Phoebe L.; Gouhier, Tarik C.; Hacker, Sally D.; Seabloom, Eric W.; Bokil, Vrushali A. (2013). "Indirect effects and facilitation among native and non-native species promote invasion success along an environmental stress gradient". Journal of Ecology. 101 (4): 905–915. doi:10.1111/1365-2745.12093. ISSN 1365-2745. S2CID 53480164.
- Schliep, Erin M.; Lany, Nina K.; Zarnetske, Phoebe L.; Schaeffer, Robert N.; Orians, Colin M.; Orwig, David A.; Preisser, Evan L. (2018). "Joint species distribution modelling for spatio-temporal occurrence and ordinal abundance data". Global Ecology and Biogeography. 27 (1): 142–155. doi:10.1111/geb.12666. ISSN 1466-8238.
- Zarnetske, Phoebe L.; Gurevitch, Jessica; Franklin, Janet; Groffman, Peter M.; Harrison, Cheryl S.; Hellmann, Jessica J.; Hoffman, Forrest M.; Kothari, Shan; Robock, Alan; Tilmes, Simone; Visioni, Daniele (2021-04-13). "Potential ecological impacts of climate intervention by reflecting sunlight to cool Earth". Proceedings of the National Academy of Sciences. 118 (15) e1921854118. Bibcode:2021PNAS..11821854Z. doi:10.1073/pnas.1921854118. ISSN 0027-8424. PMC 8053992. PMID 33876741.

== Awards and honors ==
- Harper Prize, Journal of Ecology (2014) for Zarnetske et al. (2013) paper
- Hatfield Marine Science Center, Best Poster at Markham Research Symposium (2007)
- The Wildlife Society, Utah Chapter Best Poster Award (2006)
- Ecological Society of America (ESA), E. Lucy Braun Award (2005)
- Maine Water Conference, Best Student Research Poster (2001)
