= Syngenetic permafrost growth =

Additional material is deposited to a permafrost site during freezing conditions

Syngenetic permafrost growth is a mode of the growth of permafrost whereby additional material is deposited to a permafrost site during freezing conditions, causing the permafrost layer to build upwards. It is cited as an efficient mode of permafrost growth, compared with heterogenetic permafrost growth, which occurs when freezing temperatures penetrate into previously unfrozen ground of uniform composition. Lunardini gives the basic formulas for permafrost generation under both modes.

Syngenetic deposition of frozen materials comes from any of a variety of sources, sediment from streams and rivers, material fallen from hillsides, material blown by the wind, and material deposited at the bottom of lakes. Studies of such formations are partly based on observations in the Cold Regions Research and Engineering Laboratory tunnel into permafrost near Fairbanks, Alaska.

Ice wedges that intrude into cracks in permafrost may be regarded as syngenetic, if they grow upwards.
