= Fire and carbon cycling in boreal forests =

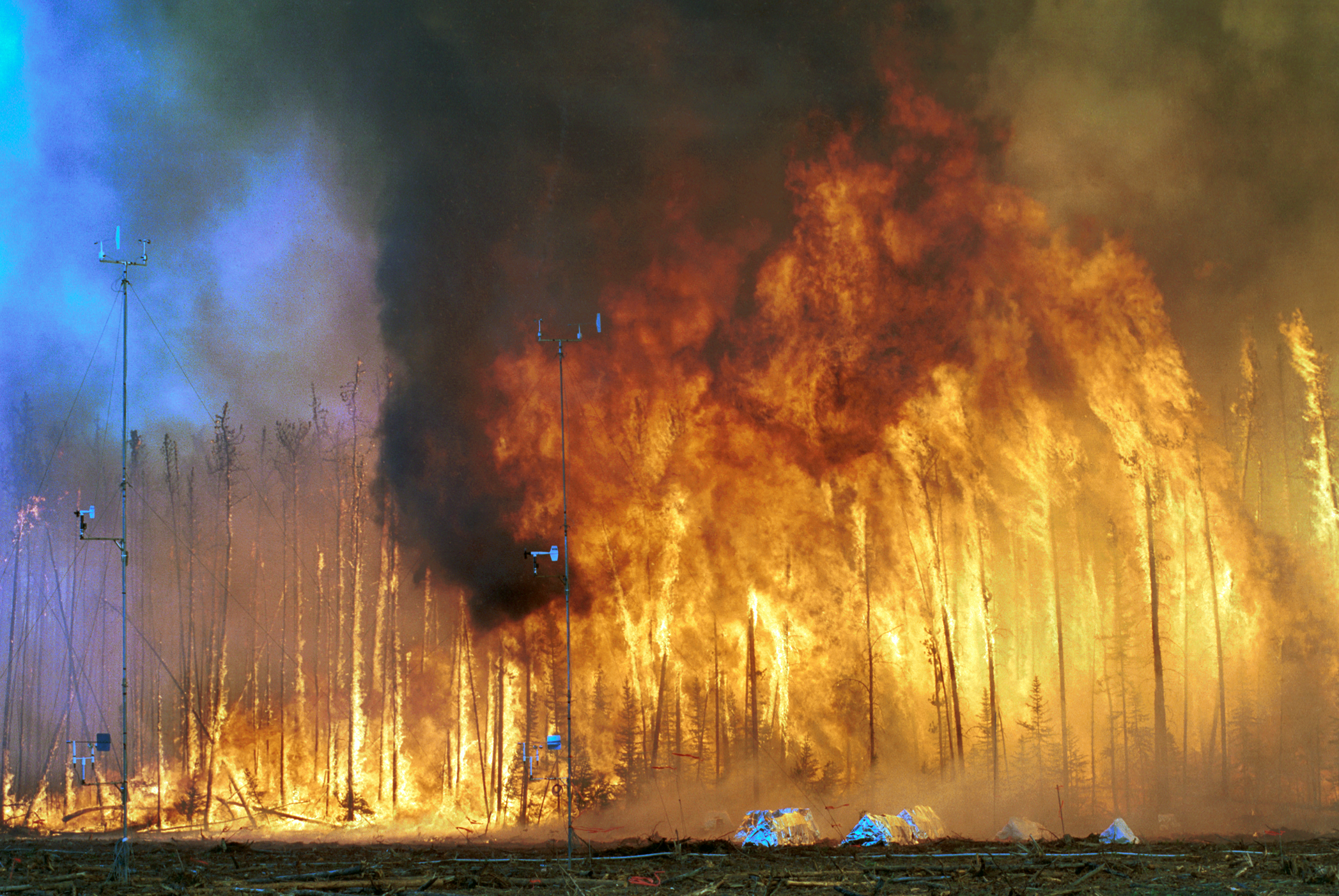
High intensity crown fire is the typical fire regime in boreal forest regions

Terrestrial ecosystems found in the boreal (or taiga) regions of North America and Eurasia cover 17% of the Earth's land surface, and contain more than 30% of all carbon present in the terrestrial biome. In terms of carbon storage, the boreal region consists of three ecosystems: boreal forest, peatland, and tundra. Vast areas of the globe and are contributing greatly to atmospheric carbon release due to increased temperature and fire hazard. High northern latitudes will experience the most significant increase in warming on the planet as a result of increased atmospheric greenhouse gases thus placing in jeopardy the carbon sink in these areas. In addition to the release of carbon through the melting of permafrost, high intensity wildfires will become more common and thus contribute to the release of stored carbon. This means that the boreal forest and its fire regime is becoming an increasingly more significant factor in determining the global carbon budget.

Boreal forests are also important economic factors in Russia and Canada specifically, and the uncertainty of fire patterns in the future as a result of climate change is a major consideration in forest management plans. A decrease in allowed timber harvest could be a solution to long term uncertainty of fire cycles.

== Carbon cycling in boreal forests ==
Although temperate and tropical forests in total cover twice as much land as boreal forest, boreal forest contains 20% more carbon than the other two combined. Boreal forests are susceptible to global warming because the ice/snow–albedo feedback is significantly influenced by surface temperature, so fire induced changes in surface albedo and infrared emissivity are more significant than in the tropics.

Boreal forest fires contribute greatly to greenhouse gas presence in the atmosphere. Large boreal fires produce enough energy to produce convective smoke columns that can break into the troposphere and occasionally penetrate across the tropopause. In addition, the cold temperature in boreal regions result in low levels of water vapor. This low level of water vapor combined with low solar radiation results in very low photochemical production of the OH radical, which is a chemical that controls the atmospheric lifetime of most tropospheric gases. Therefore, the greenhouse gas emission in boreal forest fires will have prolonged lifetimes over the forest.

=== Fire regime ===
The fire regimes of boreal forest in Canada and in Russia are distinct. In Russia, the climate is drier and the majority of fires are human caused. This means that there are more frequent fires of lower intensity than in Canada and that most carbon output as a result of fire is in Russia. Forestry practices in Russia involve the use of heavy machinery and large-scale clear-cuts, leading to the alteration of fuel complexes. This practice is reportedly causing areas to degrade into grass steppes, rather that regenerate as new forest. This may result in the shorting of fire return intervals. Industrial practices in Russia also create additional fire hazards (severe damages in the Russian Federation affect about 9 million ha). Radioactive contamination on an area of about 7 million ha creates a fire hazard because fire can redistribute radionuclides.

The majority of boreal forest fires in Canada are started by lightning. Subsequently, there are fewer fires on average in Canada but a much higher frequency of high intensity crown fire than Russia with a crown fire rate of 57% in Canada as opposed to 6% in Russia. Natural fire rotation across Canadian and Alaskan boreal forests is one to several centuries.

=== Peatland and tundra ===
Surface air temperature change over the past 50 years.

Fire indirectly plays a role in the exchange of carbon between terrestrial surface and the atmosphere by regulating soil and moisture regimes, including plant succession, photosynthesis, and soil microbial processes. Soil in boreal regions is a significant global carbon sink; boreal forest soil holds 200 Gt of carbon while boreal peatlands hold 400 Gt of carbon. Northernmost permafrost regions contain 10,355 ± 150 Pg of soil organic carbon (SOC) in the top 0-3 m and 21% of this carbon is in the soil organic layer (SOL) pool found in the top 30 cm of the ground layer.

The depth of the organic soil layer is one of the controls on permafrost, leading to a generalization of two domains in boreal forest: thick soil layer and thin soil layer. Thick organic soil insulates the subsoil from warmer summer temperatures and allows for permafrost to develop. Although permafrost keeps ground moist during winter, during summer months upper organic soil horizons will become desiccated. As average temperatures increase, Permafrost is melting at a faster rate and, correspondingly, the length of the fire season is increasing. When the fire-free interval (FFI) is decreased, the loss of the SOL may result in a domain change to a thin soil layer, leading to less carbon storage in the soil, greater fire vulnerability, and decreased permafrost. In black spruce forests, decreased FFI can ruin successional trajectories by opening the door for deciduous trees and shrubs to invade, which also further increases fire vulnerability.

Data regarding carbon storage in the permafrost region as well as fire activity in boreal forests is sparse, which is a significant barrier in determining an accurate carbon budget. An expert assessment indicates that the permafrost region will become a net carbon source by 2100.

A 5 - 10 degree C rise in forest floor temperature after a fire will significantly increase the rate of decomposition for years after the fire occurs, which temporarily turns the soil into a net carbon source (not sink) locally.

Fire enhances the biogenic emissions of NO and N20 from soil.

== See also ==
- Permafrost carbon cycle
- Carbon cycle
