= Jessica Hellmann =

American ecologist

- Education: Stanford University (PhD); University of Michigan
- Awards: Fellow of the American Association for the Advancement of Science (2020); Fellow of the Ecological Society of America (2021)
- Scientific career
- Workplaces: University of British Columbia; University of Notre Dame; University of Minnesota
- Thesis: The role of environmental variation in the dynamics of an insect-plant interaction (2000)
- Doctoral advisor: Paul R. Ehrlich

Jessica Hellmann is a Distinguished McKnight University Professor of the Department of Ecology and executive director of the Institute on the Environment and Ecolab Chair in Environmental Leadership at the University of Minnesota. She is recognized as "one of the nation’s leading researchers on global change ecology and climate adaptation". Hellmann was one of the first to identify that living with climate change is "just as crucial to the future of humanity and Earth’s ecosystems as slowing and stopping greenhouse gas emissions". Her lab uses mathematical models, genomic techniques to identify the impact of climate change on ecology and evolution, and create strategies to manage natural resources.

== Early life and education ==
Hellmann is originally from Indiana and Detroit, Michigan.

Hellmann has said she chose a career in ecology after being inspired by space camp, her grandfather's farm and her father who worked as a mechanical engineer at General Motors. She completed a Bachelor's in Ecology at the University of Michigan in 1996. She holds a PhD in Biology from Stanford. Her doctoral advisor, and role model, was Paul R. Ehrlich. She was a postdoctoral fellow in the Center for International Security and Cooperation, where she argued that the environment was an important part of security. At Stanford University, she was part of the Leopold Leadership Program. Hellmann also worked as a postdoctoral associate in the Department of Zoology at the University of British Columbia.

== Career ==
Hellmann joined the University of Notre Dame in 2003, where she served as a faculty member in the Department of Biological Sciences. She received a Woodrow Wilson National Fellowship Foundation in 2006. She researched the impact of habitat loss and fragmentation on the distribution of insects and their host plants. She concentrated on the Garry oak species, and how they could spread in a future climate. She founded Notre Dame's undergraduate minor is sustainability.

In 2011 she was awarded a Residential Fellowship from the University of Notre Dame Institute for Advanced Study. In 2012, she published the book "Advancing Adaptation In the City of Chicago". She delivered the 2012 Reilly Forum Lecture, "Fixing the global commons: what humans can and should do to help nature live and thrive through climate change". In 2013, Hellmann helped the Global Adaptation Institute relocate in the University of Notre Dame. In 2015, she became Research Director of the Notre Dame Global Adaptation Initiative (ND-GAIN), which measures climate risks and readiness to adapt to climate risks for countries around the world. She was worried about being labelled a "butterfly person", as she studied them extensively as proxy for how climate change impacts insects in general. She was described as an "influential voice surrounding climate adaptation and the environment".

In 2015, Hellmann joined the University of Minnesota as the director of the Institute on the Environment, an interdisciplinary sustainability institute. She is also a Distinguished McKnight University Professor in the University's Department of Ecology, Evolution and Behavior. She contributed to the 2016 report "A Review Of The Landscape Conservation Cooperatives" by the National Academies of Sciences, Engineering, and Medicine Committee For The Evaluation Of The Landscape Conservation. She is co-chair of the University of Minnesota Water Council. She continues to collaborate with ND-GAIN as a core research member and mentors other ND-GAIN researchers.

She has influenced governments and corporations, encouraging them to strategically invest in climate change adaptation. In 2013 and 2014 she co-wrote the National Climate Change Assessment. She is on the Board of Directors of the Great Plains Institute, the Science Advisory Council for the Environmental Law and Policy Center and the governing committee of the Natural Capital Planet. She has contributed to CNN, NPR, Fox News, The Telegraph and the Chicago Tribune. She writes for The Conversation. In 2017 she was announced as an American Association for the Advancement of Science Leshner Fellow.
