= Janet Franklin =

American geographer and landscape ecologist (born 1959)

Janet Franklin (born July 8, 1959 in Frankfurt, Germany) is an American geographer, botanist, and landscape ecologist. Her work is centered on the use of remote sensing to model and understand vegetated landscapes. She is currently a Distinguished Professor of Biogeography in the Department of Botany and Plant Sciences at the University of California, Riverside.

== Early life and education ==
Franklin grew up near San Francisco. She received a B.A. in Environmental Biology from the University of California Santa Barbara in 1979. Subsequently, she received a master's degree from UCSB in Geography in 1983, and finally a PhD from the same institution in 1988. Her thesis focused on the remote sensing of woody vegetation structures in Mali.

== Career ==
Franklin received her start in remote sensing as a doctoral candidate when she was recruited by a professor on the basis of her ability to distinguish different species of pine tree from aerial photographs.

In 1988, Franklin began teaching and researching at San Diego State University, where she remained until 2009. Her 1995 paper, Predictive vegetation mapping: geographic modeling of biospatial patterns in relation to environmental gradients, is considered a foundational work of modern, remote sensing-based landscape ecology. In 2009, she was appointed as a professor of geography at Arizona State University, becoming a Regent's Professor in 2015. From 2014 to 2016, she was president of the US chapter of the International Association of Landscape Ecology. Some of her research has focused on island ecosystems in the West Indies and Polynesia. In 2017, she was appointed to the University of California Riverside.

Franklin's work focuses on the use of remote sensing techniques to model and understand vegetated landscapes. She has made significant contributions to the study of human-caused landscape change and predictive vegetation mapping. In recent years, much of her work has focused on climate change, both present and historical.

Franklin is a member of the National Academy of Sciences and a fellow of the American Association for the Advancement of Science, the American Academy of Arts and Sciences and the Ecological Society of America. She is also the current editor-in-chief of Diversity & Distributions, a highly ranked journal on conservation biogeography.

== Selected works ==
Franklin is the author of one book and over 120 peer-reviewed academic papers.

=== Book ===
- Franklin, Janet. Mapping species distributions: spatial inference and prediction. Cambridge University Press, 2010.

=== Articles ===
- Franklin, Janet. "Predictive vegetation mapping: geographic modelling of biospatial patterns in relation to environmental gradients." Progress in physical geography 19, no. 4 (1995)
- Franklin, Janet. "Predicting the distribution of shrub species in southern California from climate and terrain‐derived variables." Journal of Vegetation Science 9, no. 5 (1998)
- Franklin, Janet. "Moving beyond static species distribution models in support of conservation biogeography." Diversity and Distributions 16, no. 3 (2010)
- Franklin, Janet, et al. "Modeling plant species distributions under future climates: how fine scale do climate projections need to be?." Global change biology 19.2 (2013)
