= Climate finance in Africa =

Climate finance is an umbrella term for financial resources such as loans, grants, or domestic budget allocations for climate change mitigation, adaptation or resiliency.

The 2024 Landscape of Climate Finance in Africa report highlights the significant challenges facing climate finance on the continent. Although climate finance flows to Africa have increased by 48%—from USD 29.5 billion in 2019/20 to USD 43.7 billion in 2021/22—a considerable funding gap remains. To meet the financial requirements of Africa's Nationally Determined Contributions (NDCs), annual climate finance flows must increase every year until 2030. This need underscores not only the escalating costs of delayed action but also the pronounced inequities in financial distribution across nations and the persistent difficulties in mobilizing private and domestic capital. The urgency for action is clear, as climate finance remains essential to addressing Africa's vulnerability to climate change.

== Africa's climate vulnerability and the need for finance ==
Africa bears severe consequences from climate change, with the continent facing an economic burden equivalent to 5–15% of its per capita GDP each year due to climate-related issues. An estimated 278 million people in Africa experience chronic hunger, and approximately 250 million live in areas with high water stress. Despite these challenges, Africa possesses substantial potential, particularly in the areas of clean and renewable energy.

In 2022, climate finance in Africa saw a significant surge following a period of stagnation due to the economic impact of the COVID-19 pandemic. Climate finance flows to Africa increased by 48%, rising from USD 29.5 billion in 2019/2020 to USD 43.7 billion in 2021/2022. Notably, in 2022, Africa's annual climate investment surpassed USD 50 billion for the first time, marking a milestone in financing efforts aimed at addressing climate change on the continent. The top four countries with the highest financial investment potential for RE in USD are Ethiopia (76B), Congo (42B), Nigeria (39B), and Kenya (36B).

To meet the investment needs for implementing its Nationally Determined Contributions (NDCs), Africa's climate finance flows must quadruple annually until 2030. Currently, only 23% of the estimated financial requirements are being met. The investment gap is substantial for both mitigation and adaptation efforts, with only 18% of annual mitigation needs and 20% of adaptation needs fulfilled as of 2021/2022.

Climate finance to Africa has remained predominantly in the form of debt, despite the region's high vulnerability to debt burdens. Approximately 51% of climate finance flows to Africa are debt-based, divided equally between low-cost debt and market-rate debt. This borrowing from capital markets has unnecessarily limited climate advancements, with some analysts believing it is costing African governments 500% more than what it would have cost had they borrowed at International Bank for Reconstruction and Development rates.

In addition, the data suggest that funders have not strategically targeted adaptation support towards those African countries with the greatest vulnerability and needs. There is no obvious difference in per capita funding levels between those countries classified as "least developed countries" (LDCs) - and those that not least developed countries.

== See also ==
- Climate finance in Ghana
- Climate finance in Nigeria
- Climate finance in Cameroon
- Climate finance in Kenya
- Climate finance in Zimbabwe
- Climate finance in Democratic Republic of the Congo
- Climate finance in Senegal
