= Climate finance in Kenya =

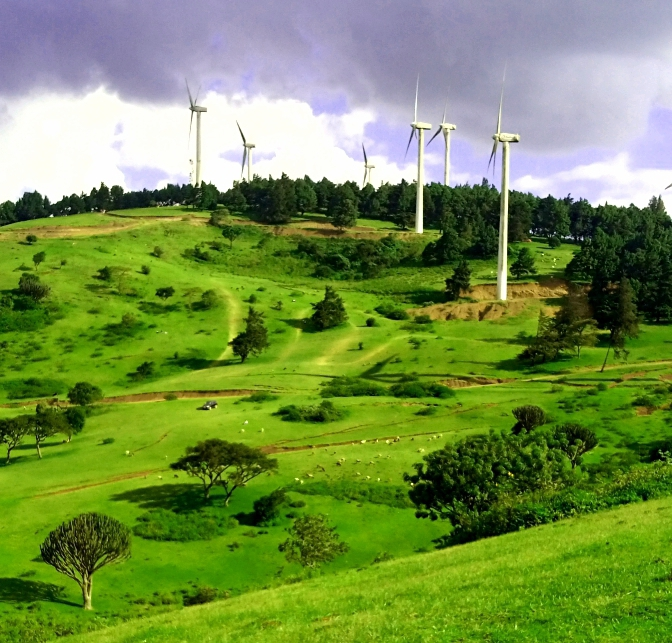
Wind turbines in the Ngong Hills, near Nairobi National Park.

Climate finance in Kenya mobilizes public and private resources to reduce greenhouse gas emissions and strengthen adaptation to climate impacts, both domestically and through international partnerships. Vulnerable to droughts and floods — phenomena that generate annual losses of up to 2.8% of GDP and have already affected more than 53 million people between 1990 and 2020 — the country requires USD 62 billion dollars by 2030 to meet its goals in the Paris Agreement, of which 87% must come from external support. By leveraging international and domestic funding sources, Kenya can continue its leadership in renewable energy, climate adaptation, and building a resilient economy that can withstand the effects of climate change.

At the domestic level, the Climate Change Act (2016), the NCCAP, and green economy policies created tax incentives, feed-in tariffs, and a national carbon registry. In the energy sector, the share of renewables in the matrix jumped from 70% to around 90% between 2018 and 2023, driven by geothermal, solar and wind projects — notably the Lake Turkana park (310 MW) — and the goal of 100% clean generation by 2030.

Despite progress, the imbalance between grants and loans persists, burdening the national budget and deepening external debt dynamics. Critics points to a lack of transparency in carbon projects (such as the Northern Kenya Rangelands Carbon Project), allegations of corruption in local funds (FLLoCA), and insufficient consultation with communities, revealing challenges of equity and governance in resource mobilization.

== Context and vulnerabilities ==
=== Climate and forest context ===
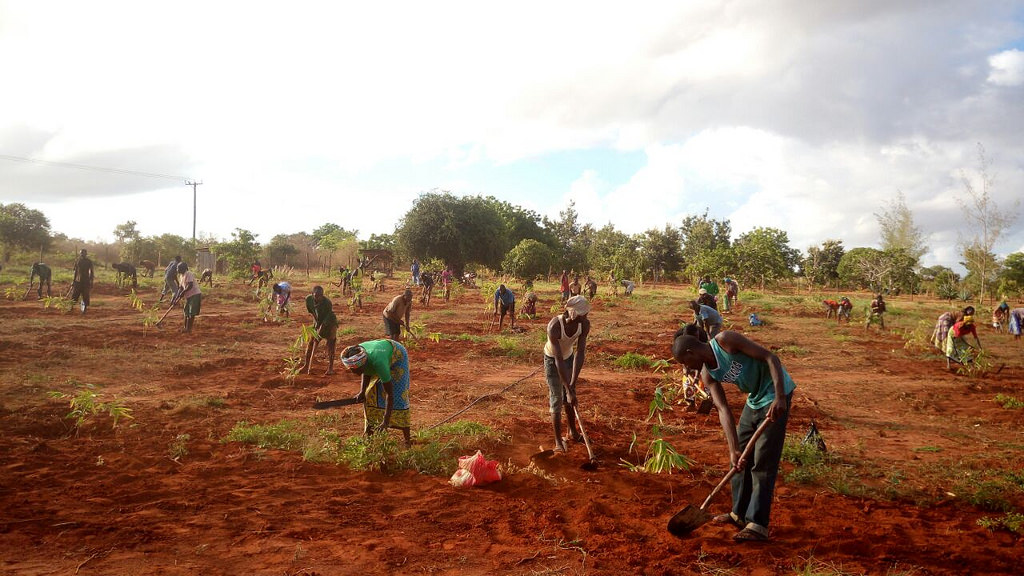
Land cultivation in Kenya

Kenya's heavy dependence on rainfed agriculture—which accounts for about 98% of the country's agricultural production—makes it extremely vulnerable to the impacts of climate change, such as increased frequency of droughts, floods, and high temperatures. These phenomena directly threaten food security, infrastructure, and national economic stability.

Climate change in Kenya is driving a notable increase in disasters such as droughts and floods; these events are estimated to create an economic liability of 2-2.8% of its GDP each year. In addition, irregular rainfall and the occurrence of extreme weather events have caused increased soil erosion and flood-related damage, with estimated economic costs of up to 5.5% of GDP every seven years.

Between 1990 and 2020, Kenya faced 16 major droughts that affected an estimated 53 million people, resulting in significant crop losses and livestock deaths.

Other natural disasters in the country that have been attributed to climate change include the locust invasion in 2020 and the floods in 2024.

Kenya has a total area of 569,140 km², of which approximately 10.7% is allocated to permanent crops and arable land, 37.4% to permanent pasture, and only 6.1% maintains forest cover. However, forest cover has been declining sharply: in 1963, forests accounted for about 11% of the country, but today only 6%.

Kenya’s agricultural sector requires a transformation toward more sustainable and climate-resilient practices. Investments are needed for the adoption of climate-smart agriculture technologies, improved water management systems, and the development of drought-resistant crops to ensure food security.

=== Economic context ===
The Government of Kenya estimates that US$62 billion will be spent on implementing the country's NDCs (mitigation and adaptation actions) between 2020 and 2030. The resource requirement for mitigation actions is US$17.7 billion, while adaptation actions will require US$43.9 billion by 2030.

=== Energy context ===
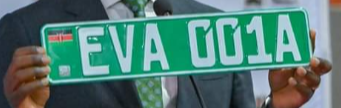
Launch of new Electric Vehicle License Plates, 2024.

In Kenya, biofuels and waste—primarily traditional biomass such as firewood and charcoal—dominate the total energy supply due to their widespread use for cooking, especially among rural households. However, there is a growing trend towards cleaner energy sources; the share of geothermal, wind power, solar, and hydropower increased from 18% of Kenya's energy supply in 2019 to 19% in 2023.

The country's energy landscape is characterized by a combination of domestic production and a significant dependence on imports, especially oil. Clean energy sources, including geothermal, wind, solar, and hydropower, account for about 24% of the country's total energy production, reflecting Kenya's strong renewable resource base and ongoing efforts to expand sustainable energy.

Electricity prices in Kenya continue to rise, reaching $0.26 per kWh for residential consumers in 2024, making it one of the highest in Africa. Several factors contribute to these high tariffs, including rising labor costs, significant system losses, and the need for cost recovery by the national power utility, Kenya Power and Lighting Company (KPLC).

Kenya recorded a remarkable 4.7% annual increase in total electricity production between 2000 and 2023, a growth strongly associated with aggressive electrification initiatives and significant investments in renewable energy infrastructure.

Kenya's electricity grid faces significant infrastructure challenges that limit its ability to provide reliable and efficient power to a population of over 50 million people. The electricity grid experiences high losses—on average, 24% of electricity, which is three times the global average—primarily due to outdated infrastructure, illegal connections, and system billing failures.

== Nationally determined contributions ==
Kenya is a party to the United Nations Framework Convention on Climate Change (UNFCCC), the Kyoto Protocol and the Paris Agreement. The country's Nationally Determined Contribution (NDC) is to decrease greenhouse gas (GHG) emissions 32% by 2030 relative to the business-as-usual (BAU) scenario at a projected cost of US$62 billion.To this end, according to the report sent to the UNFCCC, the country will need international support to cover 87% of the budget, since it will only be able to contribute 13% with its own resources.

For the 2031-2035 period, the country committed, in its second NDC, to reducing its greenhouse gas emissions 35% by 2035 (compared to current levels in 2025). In this second period, 20% of the resources would come from Kenya itself, compared to 80% from foreign sources. More specifically, the projected investment in mitigation is US$22.5 billion, of which US$4.28 billion (19%) would be domestic and US$18.34 billion (81%) would be international. In the field of adaptation, it would be 17.7 billion dollars, 3.36 billion (19%) domestic and 14.34 billion (81%) international.

== Political and legal framework ==
Considerable efforts have been made to mainstream climate change considerations into the country's plans, policies, strategies, projects and programme translating into "Kenya Vision 2030," which is the long-term development blueprint encapsulating adaptation and mitigation programs and projects.

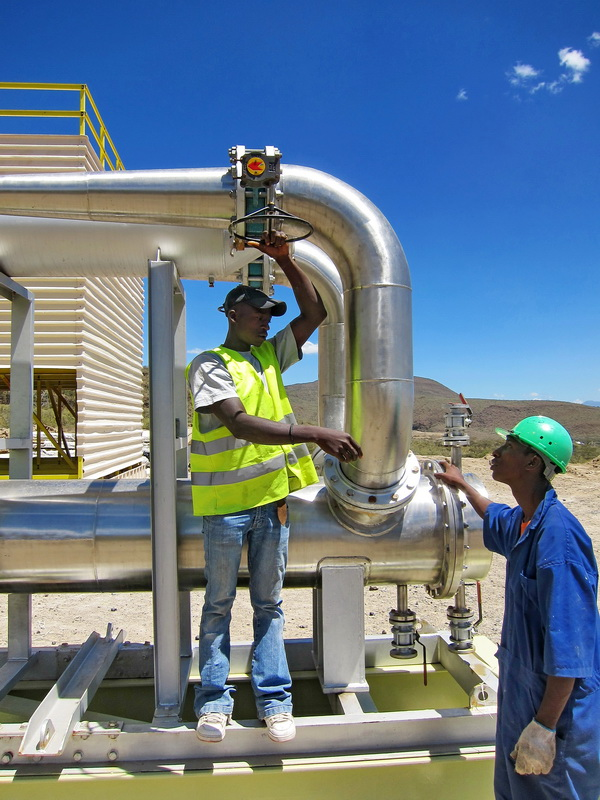
Workers at a geothermal plant in Olkaria.

One of the country's main energy goals is to diversify its energy mix, prioritizing renewable sources. To this end, it intends to gradually reduce its dependence on fossil fuels, making the most of its enormous geothermal, solar, wind, and hydroelectric potential. In this context, achieving the ambitious target of generating 100% of electricity from clean sources would position Kenya as a continental leader in sustainability.

In addition to the transition to renewable energy, the government seeks to facilitate universal access to electricity by 2030, ensuring that no community remains disconnected. To this end, strategies are being adopted that combine conventional grid expansion with off-grid wind farm solutions, especially in rural and isolated areas. At the same time, there is a strong commitment to promoting a just and equitable energy transition, aligning sectoral reforms with global climate goals and ensuring that benefits reach all social groups without exacerbating pre-existing inequalities.

Finally, recognizing that the growth of renewable generation requires robust infrastructure, Kenya plans to expand transmission and distribution capacity to 100GW by 2040, strengthening system reliability to meet projected future demand. In addition, the country will invest in clean cooking technologies, such as efficient stoves and low-impact heating systems, to reduce dependence on traditional biomass—firewood and charcoal—and mitigate associated environmental and health impacts.

Achieving these ambitious energy goals will require an estimated investment of US$40 billion over the next decade.

Other key policies include the National Climate Change Response Strategy (NCCRS), 2010; which was the first national policy document on climate change. It aims to advance the integration of climate change into all government planning and budgeting. To operationalize the NCCRS, the National Climate Change Action Plan (NCCAP) was prepared; this is a five-year plan that outlined a path to low carbon climate resilient development. In 2023, the country published its third NCCAP, which will be in effect until 2027.

To provide a legal framework for climate change, the Climate Change Act was enacted in 2016. The Act established governance structures for climate change management in the country including the National Climate Change Council. Other supporting policies include the National Policy on Climate Finance; the Green Economy Strategy and Implementation Plan; and the Climate Change Act 2016.

Furthermore, a series of financial and tax incentives have been created to further encourage private sector participation. These include tax relief options, credit guarantees, subsidized investment funds, feed-in tariffs, and net metering systems. These mechanisms not only reduce the risks perceived by foreign investors but also promote local investment, increase the projected rate of return, and foster the development of residential solar systems.

In response to the forest crisis, Kenya has launched sustainability initiatives such as the National Land Use Policy, which aims to coordinate land management, promote sustainable use, and balance development with environmental protection.

Kenya's Climate Smart Agriculture (CSA) Framework (2018–2027) aims to promote climate-resilient and low-carbon agriculture, ensuring food security and supporting the development goals set out in the country's Vision 2030.

=== Investment incentives ===
Kenya has been making progress in climate finance and sustainable investments by aligning with international transparency standards, such as mandatory sustainability reporting in accordance with International Financial Reporting Standards (IFRS S2), scheduled for 2027.

In 2024, the country introduced the climate regulation on carbon markets, which establishes a legal basis for the trading of carbon credits and creates a National Carbon Registry, aimed at both voluntary and regulated markets.

The country's renewable energy incentive tariffs offer fixed rates for electricity generated from sources such as wind, solar, geothermal, and biomass, which reduces risk for investors and promotes price predictability.

Kenya allows up to 100% foreign ownership in most sectors (except energy and lighting), provided the minimum investment is $100,000. To further stimulate external investment, the country has signed several agreements with other countries — such as Denmark, France, Germany, India, among others — to avoid double taxation.

To diversify its matrix and attract capital, Kenya has turned to Independent Power Producers (IPPs). Through these partnerships, wind, solar, and geothermal capacity has expanded significantly across the country. However, the need for government authorization of Power Purchasing Agreements (PPAs) has been a frequent bottleneck, delaying the execution of some projects despite investor appetite.

In a significant regulatory change, new rules introduced in 2024 sought to end controls on state-owned agencies KETRACO and KPLC, allowing private companies open access to transmission and distribution networks for a fee.

Furthermore, new tools such as a national green taxonomy and climate disclosure standards—finalized in April 2025 by the Central Bank of Kenya in partnership with the European Investment Bank—aim to align financial flows with the country's environmental goals.

== Climate finance flows ==
In 2018, US$2.4 billion of public and private capital was invested in climate-related investments. This is approximately one-third of the financing that Kenya needs annually to meet the targets set in its NDC.

=== Public ===
Domestically, the Kenyan government's 2025/26 budget allocated Kenyan shillings 103.8 million to environmental protection, water resources and natural resource management programmes, compared with 110.1 million in the previous budget, marking a significant cut even as droughts and floods intensified in the country. In the same budget, the Financing Locally Led Climate Action (FLLoCA) project, which aims to strengthen counties' capacity to implement community-based adaptation initiatives, nearly doubled its funding, from 5.9 million to 11.5 million, signaling a prioritization of decentralized resilience.

The Rural Electrification and Renewable Energy Corporation is deploying off-grid solar systems in public schools to reach marginalized communities.

=== Private ===
In the private finance sector, over 95 impact investors are managing over 136 impact capital vehicles in Kenya. Over $650 million of private investment capital flowed into Kenya between 2005 and 2015 predominantly funding renewable energy projects.

BasiGo, a Kenyan electric bus company, launched in early 2022 with just two vehicles and has since expanded its fleet to over 28 buses operating nationwide. In partnership with Kenya Power, BasiGo is developing a network of charging stations along strategic routes, leveraging Kenya's predominantly renewable electricity grid.

The Sustainable Finance Initiative, launched by the Kenya Banker's Association (KBA) in 2015, represented an important step forward in incorporating environmental, social, and corporate governance (ESG) principles into the banking sector. In addition, the KBA updated its guidelines to align with global standards, encouraging financial institutions to promote green finance, expand social impact, and strengthen risk management. Leading banks such as Absa Bank Kenya, have adopted ambitious goals—such as achieving net-zero emissions by 2040—and have been integrating ESG frameworks into their credit portfolios and risk management strategies.

Green bonds in Kenya have emerged as a key tool for mobilizing private capital for sustainable development. The Nairobi Stock Exchange (NSE), KBA, and the Climate Bond Initiative (CBI) have introduced specific guidelines to support this market. In 2019, Acorn Holdings issued the country's first certified green bond, raising $40 million.

Peercarbon is a Kenyan fintech that helps small and medium-sized businesses monitor their emissions, reduce CO₂, and obtain green financing through a simplified carbon accounting system and decarbonization tools tailored to each sector.

Founded in 2013, 4G Capital is a digital credit institution headquartered in Nairobi. It offers unsecured loans and business training to micro and small businesses, having released 610,000 loans totaling $79 million.

The Kenya Renewable Energy Association (KEREA) is an independent non-profit organization established in August 2002 to support the renewable energy sector in Kenya. Its activities include developing and reviewing technical standards, proposing regulatory proposals, and coordinating working groups to discuss the use of clean technologies. The association brings together companies and professionals in the renewable energy value chain and provides advocacy and capacity building to facilitate the implementation of projects in the country.

=== International cooperation and external financing ===
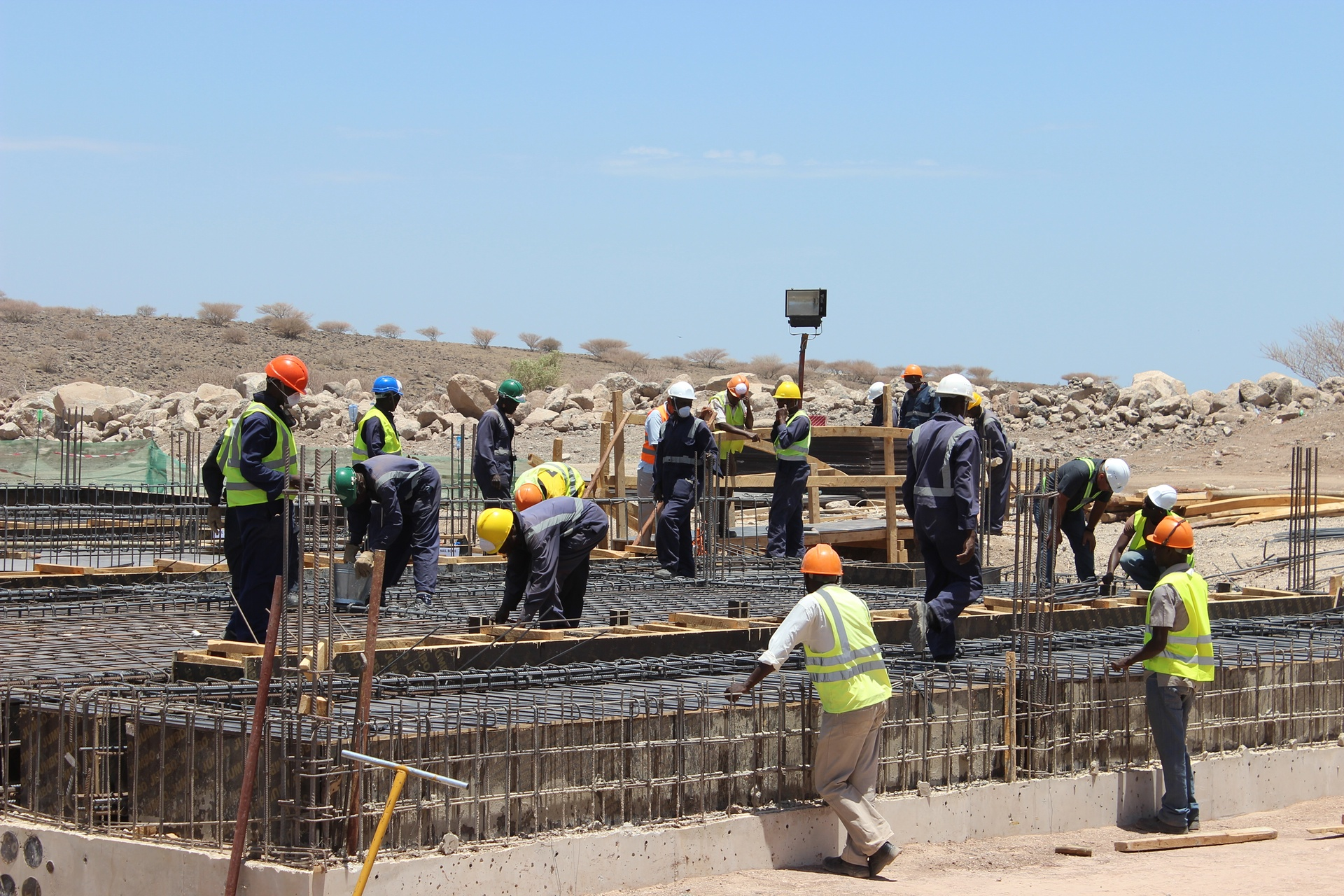
Construction of the Lake Turkana project, 2015

To foster mobility solutions with a lower environmental impact, the African Development Bank has allocated $1 million in loans to a technical assistance program for Kenya and other African nations, focusing on promoting cleaner and more efficient transportation systems.

The Lake Turkana Wind Power (LTWP) wind project, with a generating capacity of 310 MW, is the largest wind farm in Africa and represents the largest private investment in Kenya's history, supported by a consortium of international financiers and investors. The initiative significantly expanded the country's renewable energy capacity, estimated to represent approximately 20% of installed electricity and contributing to the diversification of Kenya's energy matrix.

The country also relies on the International Monetary Fund through the Extended Fund Facility and Extended Credit Facility, which totals approximately 3.6 billion dollars and foresees a disbursement of approximately 480 million in the ninth review; however, this review was abandoned in March 2025, sparking criticism over the conditions and reliance on external borrowing to finance essential expenditures.

== Main sectors benefited ==
Just over 79% of climate finance in Kenya was allocated to climate mitigation measures, while adaptation accounted for only 11.7% of financial flows. Seventy-nine percent of international public climate finance was delivered through debt, and 55% of that was channeled primarily to mitigation activities.

Kenya's transportation sector—especially diesel-powered matatus and taxis—is a major source of urban air pollution and carbon emissions. The rapid adoption of electric motorcycles has shown promise: in 2024, these vehicles accounted for 7.1% of new registrations, up from 3.6% in 2023.

== Impacts and results ==
Kenya has made significant progress in its clean energy transition, with the share of electricity generated from renewable sources increasing from 70% in 2018 to approximately 90% in 2023, positioning the country as a continental leader in green energy. This shift is underpinned by major investments in drought-resistant geothermal energy, as well as the operation of Africa's largest wind farm, the 310 MW Lake Turkana project.

Electricity access has expanded rapidly in Kenya, reaching 79% of the population in 2023, and the country is on track to achieve universal access by 2030. Off-grid solutions are also playing a crucial role, with one in five households using solar mini-grids or stand-alone systems, especially in rural areas and underserved communities.

The adoption of clean cooking technologies has improved significantly in Kenya, with rates increasing from 10% in 2013 to 31% in 2023, reflecting targeted policy and market interventions.

== Criticism and controversies ==
While the Lake Turkana project is celebrated for its technical achievements and economic benefits at the national level, it has also generated local controversies, including disputes over land rights, accusations of land grabbing, and concerns about the distribution of project benefits among neighboring communities. Rapid privatization and infrastructure development have transformed local land values and social relations, generating both new opportunities and forms of exclusion for indigenous populations.

Similarly, carbon offset projects face accusations of lack of consent from indigenous communities and methodological weaknesses. The Northern Kenya Rangelands Carbon Project (NKRCP), backed by corporations such as Meta and Netflix, was suspended by the certification body Verra after a court ruling found that two conservancies were established unconstitutionally and without proper consultation with local populations.

Several African climate justice organizations, such as the Pan African Climate Justice Alliance (PACJA), criticize the use of loans labeled as "climate finance" for burdening vulnerable populations with interest and repayments that fall on the national budget and direct citizens. Jessica Mwanzia of the Pan African Climate Justice Alliance stated that "it is completely immoral to burden African communities, who are already paying the full price of climate change, with unfair loans to mitigate a disaster, apparently caused by the financier." Susan Otieno, executive director of ActionAid Kenya, and other experts point out that such loans have hampered the country's ability to invest in essential climate action, worsening the debt crisis and limiting adaptation policies.

Academics and human rights organizations warn of the perpetuation of neocolonial dynamics, in which international creditors impose structural reforms—such as fiscal austerity and privatization —in exchange for resources, limiting Kenya's political autonomy. Fadhel Kaboub, economist and president of the Global Institute for Sustainable Prosperity, argues that the IMF and World Bank impose austerity on the Global South, while they should be providing subsidies and canceling climate debts in the North.

Reports from the Kenyan National Treasury have exposed misuse of funds from the Financing Locally Led Climate Action (FLLoCA) program, with cases of misappropriated budget amendments in counties like Kakamega, which allegedly misappropriated tens of millions of shillings to contractors without clear bidding processes. Faith Ngige of the Kenya Platform for Climate Governance (KPCG) charges that "there is political interference in determining which projects are designated as FLLoCA, and communities are unable to distinguish between ordinary development projects and what is designated as a FLLoCA project."

== Future prospects ==
Kenya's energy sector reforms are centered on harnessing its vast renewable resources —with an estimated potential of 10,000 MW in geothermal power and between 3,000–4,600 MW in wind power —as well as expanding solar power and investing in large-scale energy storage, as part of a continent-wide initiative to develop 5 GW of storage capacity by 2027. This vast geothermal resource is predominantly located along the East African Rift Valley, which runs through the country from north to south and is home to numerous high-temperature geothermal fields.

Kenya receives high solar irradiance, averaging around 5 kWh/m² per day across most of the territory, making it exceptionally suitable for both large-scale solar solutions and off-grid solar systems. Regions such as Turkana stand out for their particularly strong and consistent solar potential, ranking among the highest in East Africa.

The main state agencies, KETRACO and KPLC, are planning significant expansions of the transmission and distribution network over the next decade, aiming to improve capacity, efficiency and connectivity in rural areas.

== See also ==
- Climate change in Africa
- Climate finance in Nigeria
- Climate finance in Senegal
