= Climate finance in Nigeria =

Climate financing in Nigeria

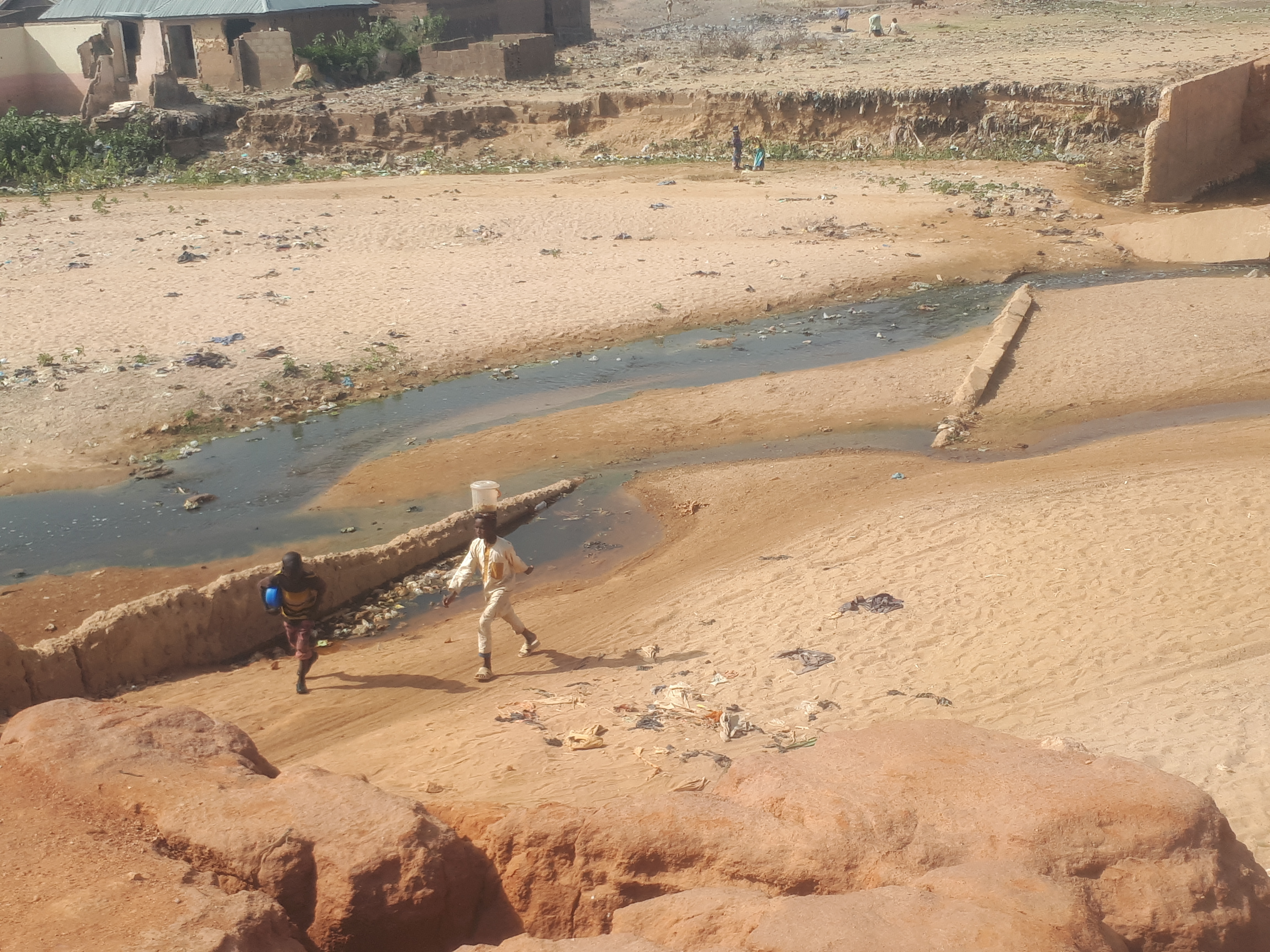
Process of land degradation in the town of Gombe, in eastern Nigeria, in 2023.

Climate finance in Nigeria includes a mixture of domestic and internationally sourced funding for climate change adaptation, mitigation and resilience.

As Africa's largest economy and one of the continent's leading oil producers, Nigeria faces significant challenges related to climate change, including flooding, desertification, and dependence on fossil fuels, which directly impact its economy and food security. The country seeks to align its climate policies with the goals of the Paris Agreement, utilizing a combination of public and private funds and international cooperation to achieve the targets set out in its Nationally Determined Contribution (NDC).

== Context and Vulnerabilities ==
=== Agricultural and Forestry Context ===
Map of the Köppen-Geiger climate classification of Nigeria for the period 1980–2016

Nigeria has a total land area of 910,770 km^{2}, of which 77% is devoted to agricultural crops (including arable land, permanent crops and pastures) and 22% is covered by forests as of 2020. According to the World Bank, the agricultural sector is responsible for 34% of job creation in the country. However, soil degradation affects about 33% of agricultural land, exacerbated by climate change.

The agriculture sector still accounts for about 23% of the country's GDP according to 2021 World Bank data. Changing rainfall patterns, increased flooding, and desertification in the north of the country threaten food security and livelihoods in Nigeria; the country is already facing food shortages compared to domestic demand. The increase in imports of staple foods, such as rice, exemplifies the difficulty in meeting the country's food demand. In 2019, it was found that Nigeria consumed 7 million tons of the grain, but only produced 3.7 million tons themselves.

According to the 2012 Post-Disaster Needs Assessment (PDNA) Report, the floods, which began in July of that year, resulted in an estimated US$16.9 billion in damage, highlighting the need for investments in adaptation.

=== Energy Context ===
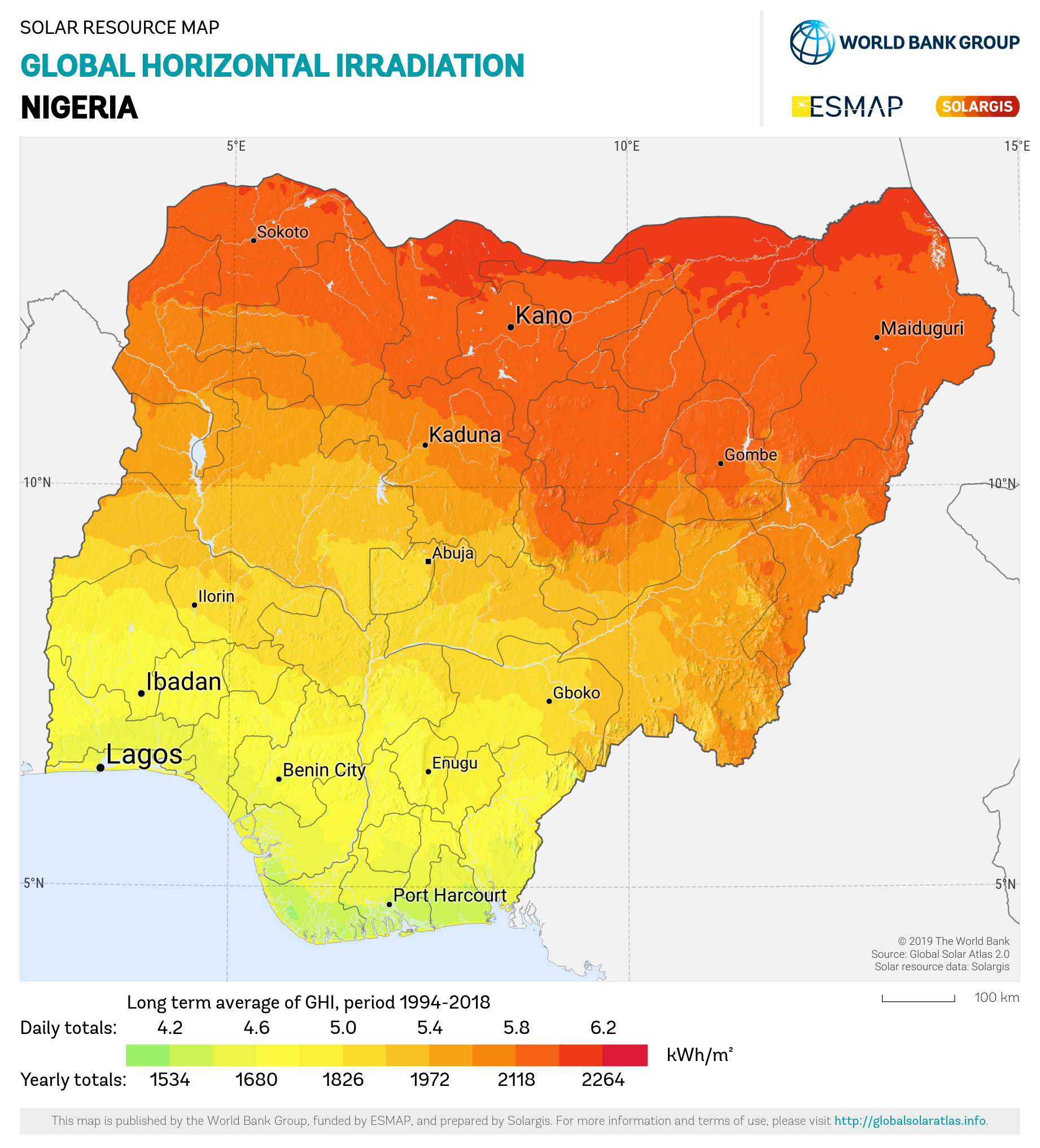
Map with a summary of solar energy potential in Nigeria

1. Coal (1.10%)
2. Crude Oil (32.2%)
3. Natural Gas (22.2%)
4. Hydroelectricity (1.10%)
5. Biofuels and waste (43.4%)

Nigeria's energy sector is dominated by biofuels and waste (43.4% of total energy supply), mainly firewood and charcoal, used by 65% of households for daily needs such as cooking. Electricity is largely generated by natural gas (75%), while renewable sources such as hydropower (1.1%) and solar (0.3% in 2022) represent a small fraction of the energy mix. Despite its vast renewable potential, Nigeria has only 2,062 MW of installed hydropower capacity out of an estimated 14,120 MW potential. Solar potential is estimated at up to 210 GW, yet only 1% of the country's territory is currently utilized.

The installed electricity capacity is 12.5 GW, but only 3,500 to 5,000 MW is available due to significant transmission and distribution losses (28-40%). Even so, Nigeria's electricity demand far exceeds the grid's maximum capacity, at around 17,556 MWh/h in 2020, according to official data. In 2023, the electricity access rate was 61.2%, with a significant disparity between urban (89%) and rural areas (less than 33%) in a context where frequent electricity grid failures cost the economy around US$29 billion per year.

=== Economic Context ===
Nigeria is considered the largest economy on the African continent, with a GDP of US$188.27 billion in 2023 and a population of 233.3 million, but its GDP per capita is the lowest among the ten largest African economies due to its large population. The country's financial sector is the third-largest tier-1 banking market in Africa, with banks such as FBN Holdings, Access Bank, and Zenith Bank leading regional rankings. The Nigerian Stock Exchange (NGX) reached a market capitalization of approximately US$47 billion as of June 2025, with 148 listed companies, although none are exclusively dedicated to renewable energy.

Despite the potential, green finance is limited as investment incentives prioritize the fossil fuel sector as Nigeria is Africa's largest crude oil producer. In 2020, the country spent $71.3 billion on imports, exceeding exports by $43.6 billion, mostly due to reliance on imported refined petroleum despite domestic refining capacity.

== Political and Legal frameworks ==
Nigeria has integrated climate change into its policies through documents such as the "Nigeria Energy Transition Plan" (2021) and the "National Energy Policy" (2022), which promote renewable energy targets and expansion of the sustainable investment market.

The 2021 Climate Change Act established the National Climate Change Council, responsible for coordinating climate policy and managing the National Climate Change Fund.

To attract investment, the government offers incentives such as feed-in tariffs, tax exemptions, reduced import duties, and special economic zones (SEZs) that allow full tax exemption and profit repatriation. Foreigners can hold 100% equity in projects, subject to registration with the Corporate Affairs Commission (CAC) and approvals from the Nigerian Electricity Regulatory Commission (NERC) and the Federal Competition and Consumer Protection Commission (FCCPC). However, corruption, bureaucracy, and delays in approving power purchase agreements (PPAs) hamper renewable energy investments.

Since 2019, the Nigerian Stock Exchange has required ESG (environmental, social, and governance) reporting for listed companies, and from 2027, sustainability reporting aligned with IFRS S2 standards will be mandatory. The Nigerian Sustainable Banking Principles (NSBP) require banks to integrate environmental and social factors into their decisions and report impacts transparently.

=== Nationally determined contributions ===
Nigeria has been a party to the United Nations Framework Convention on Climate Change (UNFCCC) since 1994 and ratified the Kyoto Protocol in 2004. The country's first Nationally Determined Contribution (NDC) was submitted in 2015, with a commitment to reduce emissions of short-lived climate pollutants and hydrofluorocarbon 47% by 2030, at a projected cost of US$542 billion. In 2021, Nigeria published its updated NDC.

The NDCs include targets to increase the share of renewable energy to 30% by 2030 and to achieve universal energy access by 2060. Meanwhile, achieving carbon neutrality by 2060 requires an estimated US$410 billion in investment.

== Climate Finance Flows ==
=== Public ===
Between 2012 and 2016, the majority of climate finance in Nigeria came from the national budget, with US$4.8 million allocated from the Climate Investment Fund, a £17,000 DFID grant, and US$352,000 from the Global Environment Facility. Additionally, in 2024, the Development Bank of Nigeria was also accredited to access between US$50 million and US$250 million from the Green Climate Fund to support climate change measures. Climate finance also flowed from the Heinrich Böll Foundation (HBS) between 2012 and 2016 worth €423,320.

According to the 2012 Post-Disaster Needs Assessment (PDNA) Report for the UNFCCC in 2017, important financing needs include flood management and the need to repair damages of US$16.9 billion. In addition, investments of about US$177 billion are needed to mitigate the challenges of waste, water resources, and greenhouse gases.

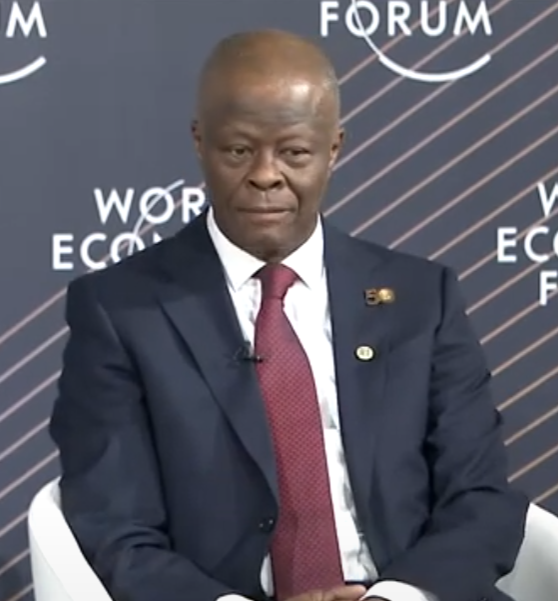
Wale Edun, Minister of Finance and Coordinating Minister for the Economy, at the World Economic Forum Special Meeting on Global Collaboration, Growth and Energy for Development, 2024

In 2024, the government allocated resources to the Climate Change Fund, with support from the World Bank, the International Finance Corporation (IFC), and the IMF, to expand green finance. In April 2025, the Minister of Finance and Coordinating Minister for the Economy, Wale Edun, met with Dr. Nkiruka Madueke, Director-General of the Nigeria Climate Change Council (NCCC), to discuss the launch of the Climate Change Fund, aimed at supporting climate solutions and boosting green finance. However, the prioritization of fossil fuel investments and the flaring of 7 billion cubic meters of gas annually, resulting in losses of US$2.5 billion, limit progress in clean energy.

=== Private ===
In addition to government funding, there is funding from the C40 Group of Major Cities for Climate Leadership, worth US$3 million, US$1,515,512 from Fidelity Bank, and US$2 million from the World Bank. Banks such as Access Bank, First Bank of Nigeria, and United Bank for Africa have adhered to the Partnership for Carbon Accounting Finance (PCAF) standards to promote emissions transparency. Despite this, according to a 2022 analysis titled Nigeria Green Tagging Banking Review, the banking sector continues to lend primarily to carbon-intensive industries.

In 2017, the Nigerian government issued Africa's first sovereign bond worth US$29 million, which financed solar energy projects for universities and off-grid communities. Between 2019 and 2021, four corporate green bonds and one sovereign green bond were issued worth approximately US$38.02 million.

=== International Cooperation and External Financing ===
Nigeria relies heavily on external financing to meet its NDC climate targets. Organizations such as the Green Climate Fund, the World Bank, and the German Society for International Cooperation (GIZ) are among the key sources. In 2023, the Nigerian Bank of Industry partnered with FSD Africa to expand climate finance. However, about 75% of international public climate finance is provided through debt, increasing the country's financial burden.

== Main sectors benefited ==
=== Energy ===
The transition to renewable energy is a national priority, with emphasis on hydroelectric projects, such as the Kainji plant (760 MW), commissioned in 1968; and solar projects, including off-grid systems and mini-grids. In 2016, the government signed PPAs with 14 solar developers, but projects stagnated due to the reduction of feed-in tariffs.

In 2022, installed renewable energy capacity was 24.5%, with hydroelectric representing 96% of this total. In 2023, investment in clean energy increased by more than 900% compared to 2022, totaling US$69.3 million, of which the majority is from public-private partnerships.

=== Transport ===
The transportation sector, dominated by tricycles (keke napap), minibuses (danfos), and motorcycles (okadas), is a major source of urban pollution. The electric vehicle (EV) market is on the rise in the country, driven by concerns about pollution and fuel costs. Some initiatives promote EV adoption through subsidies and free charging stations, although charging infrastructure remains limited.

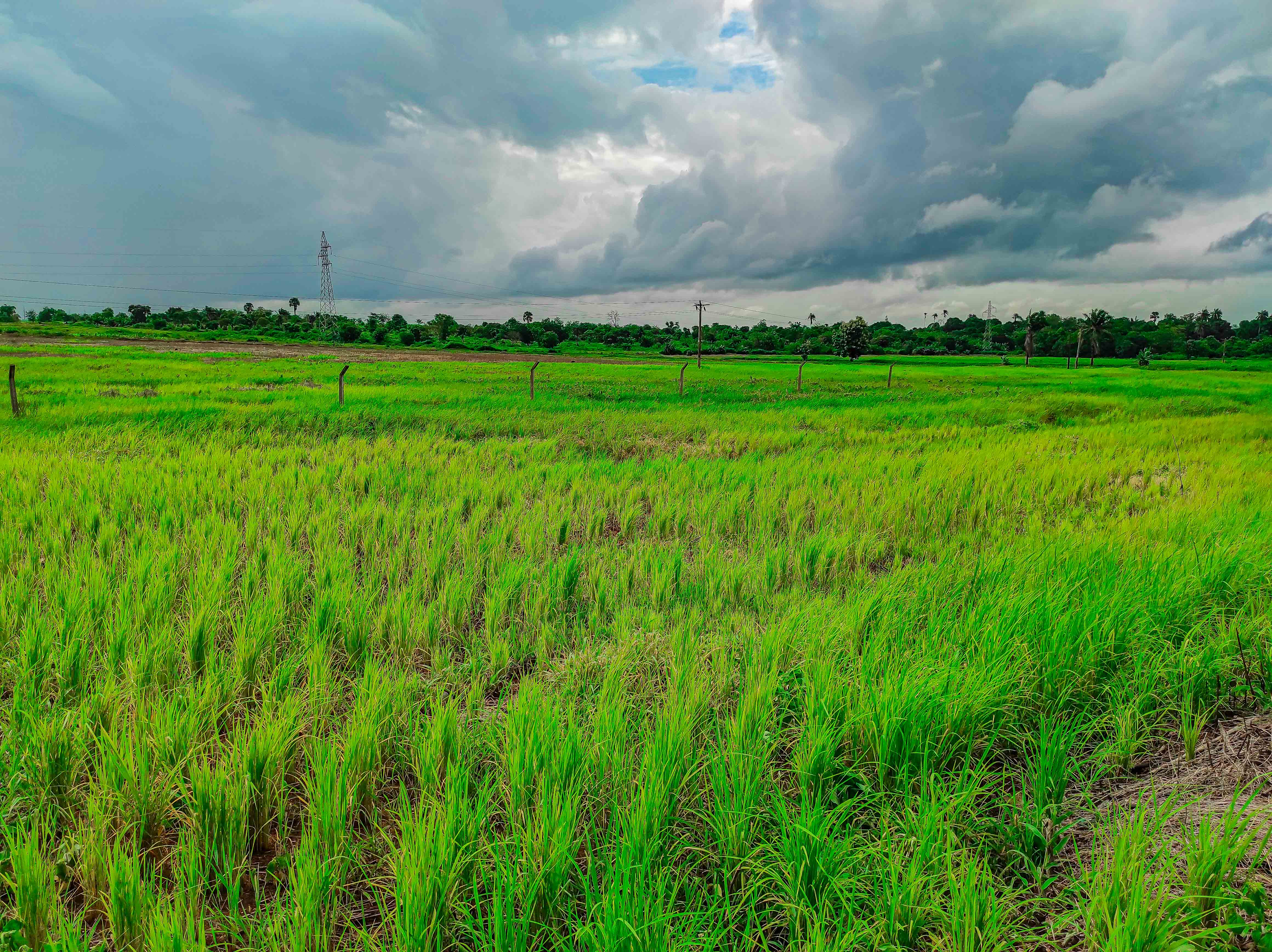
Rice plantation in Nigeria

=== Agriculture and Forests ===
The country has committed to restoring 4 million hectares of degraded land by 2030 under the African Forest Landscape Restoration Initiative (AFR100) and achieving Land Degradation Neutrality (LDN) in the same period, with an estimated investment of US$194 billion.

== Future Prospects ==
Nigeria has vast renewable potential, with 14,120 MW in hydropower and up to 210 GW in solar, but underutilization persists. The removal of fuel subsidies in 2023 and the liberalization of the foreign exchange market have increased its attractiveness to investors, but regulatory instability remains an obstacle.

== See also ==
- Climate change in Kenya
- Climate finance in Kenya
- Climate finance in Jamaica
- Climate finance in Trinidad and Tobago
- Climate finance in Senegal
