= Climate finance in Senegal =

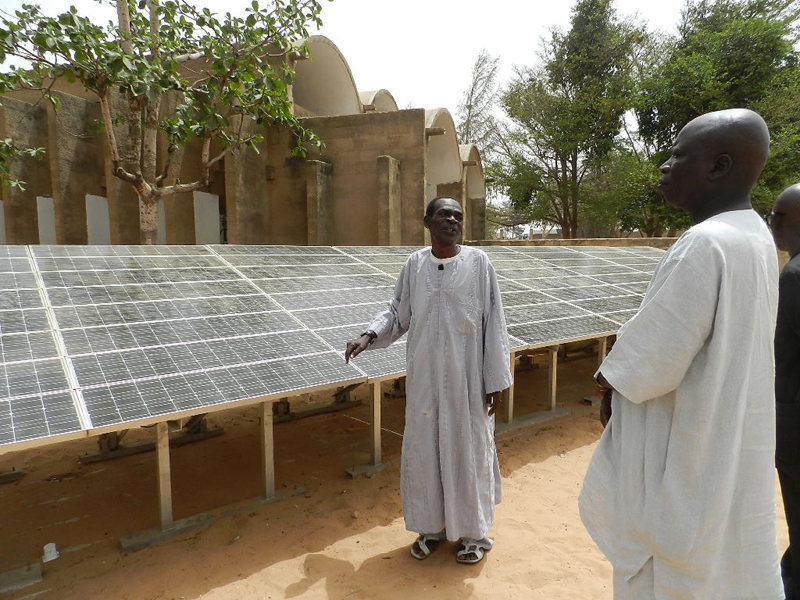
Solar panels in Dakar.

Climate finance in Senegal encompasses public and private resources aimed at addressing the challenges posed by a highly variable climate and significant socioeconomic vulnerabilities. The country, located in the tropical – Sahelian transition zone, experiences dry and rainy cycles controlled by the seasonal migration of the intertropical convergence zone and the trade winds. This pattern has become increasingly unpredictable, with prolonged droughts and extreme rainfall becoming more frequent, impacting rain fed agriculture —which accounts for a significant portion of the rural economy—and generating devastating floods.

The Senegalese energy sector remains heavily dependent on fossil fuels, while renewable sources (solar, wind, and hydro) reached 36–40% overall. Although per capita emissions are relatively low, this exceeds the average for many sub-Saharan African countries. The electrification rate reached 84% in 2023, with urban coverage of 97% and rural coverage of 64%. Senegal faces the challenge of mobilizing domestic and external resources to meet ambitious climate targets and promote climate-resilient development.

== Context and vulnerabilities ==
=== Climatic context ===
Senegal is located in the tropical-Sahelian transition zone, with three main climatic regions: the coastal zone, characterized by mild winters and concentrated rainfall from June to October, with average annual rainfall of around 500 mm; the Sahelian zone, north of the Senegal River, with a well-defined dry season from November to May, highs that can exceed 40 °C in May and average annual rainfall of around 360 mm; and the Sudanese zone, in the south, with a humid tropical climate, annual rainfall between 740 mm and 1,270 mm and savanna or sparse forest vegetation. The seasonal migration of the Intertropical Convergence Zone and the trade winds determines the dry cycle (November–May) and the rainy cycle (June–October). This climate pattern, however, has shown an increase in rainfall variability and intensification of extreme events (prolonged droughts and intense rainfall), in line with climate change projections for the Sahel region.

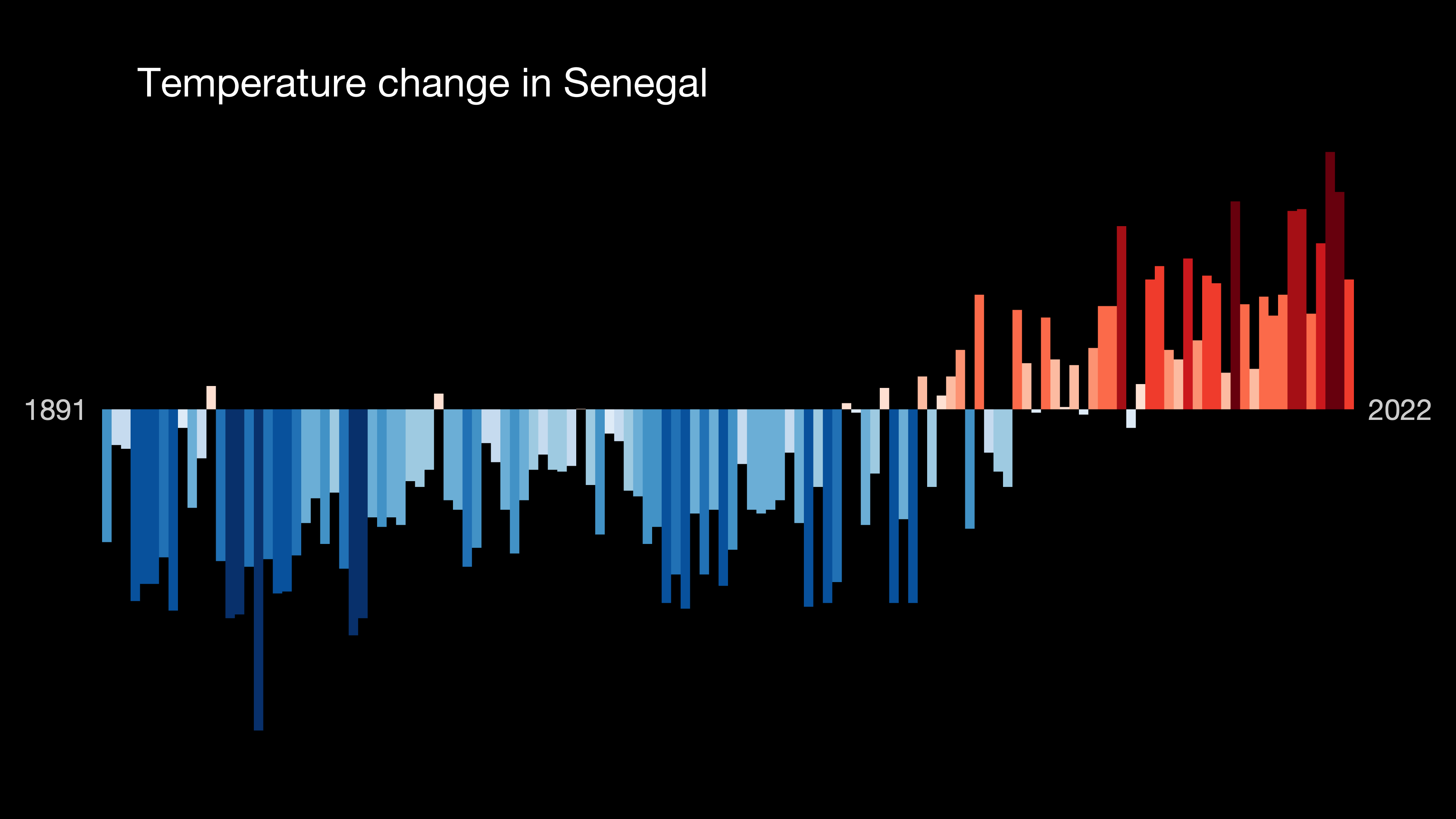
Historical temperature metrics for Senegal, 1891-2022

Senegalese agriculture is predominantly rainfed and extremely vulnerable to rainfall fluctuations and temperature rises. Projections indicate that, under the IPCC's " business as usual " scenario, upland rice productivity in the country could be reduced by up to 50% by 2100 if varieties and practices adapted to future climate conditions are not adopted. Vulnerability mapping shows that the Tambacounda, Kaffrine, Sedhiou, Kolda, and Kedougou regions have high levels of sensitivity, exposure, and low adaptive capacity, especially for crops such as rice, onions, and okra.

In November 2024, "unprecedented" flooding in the Podor region affected more than 16,000 hectares of crops and left around 200,000 people food insecure, highlighting the deterioration of local response capacity to heavy rainfall attributed to climate change.

Rising sea levels and increased extreme tides have exacerbated erosion and flooding in coastal areas. In the Dakar region, assessments based on the Coastal Vulnerability Index (CVI) classify 36% of the coastline as at high risk of submersion and erosion. Studies of historical levels indicate that extreme sea levels in Dakar have been increasing at a rate of 8.4 mm/year and, without mitigation measures, could increase the frequency of critical events by up to 20 times by 2100.

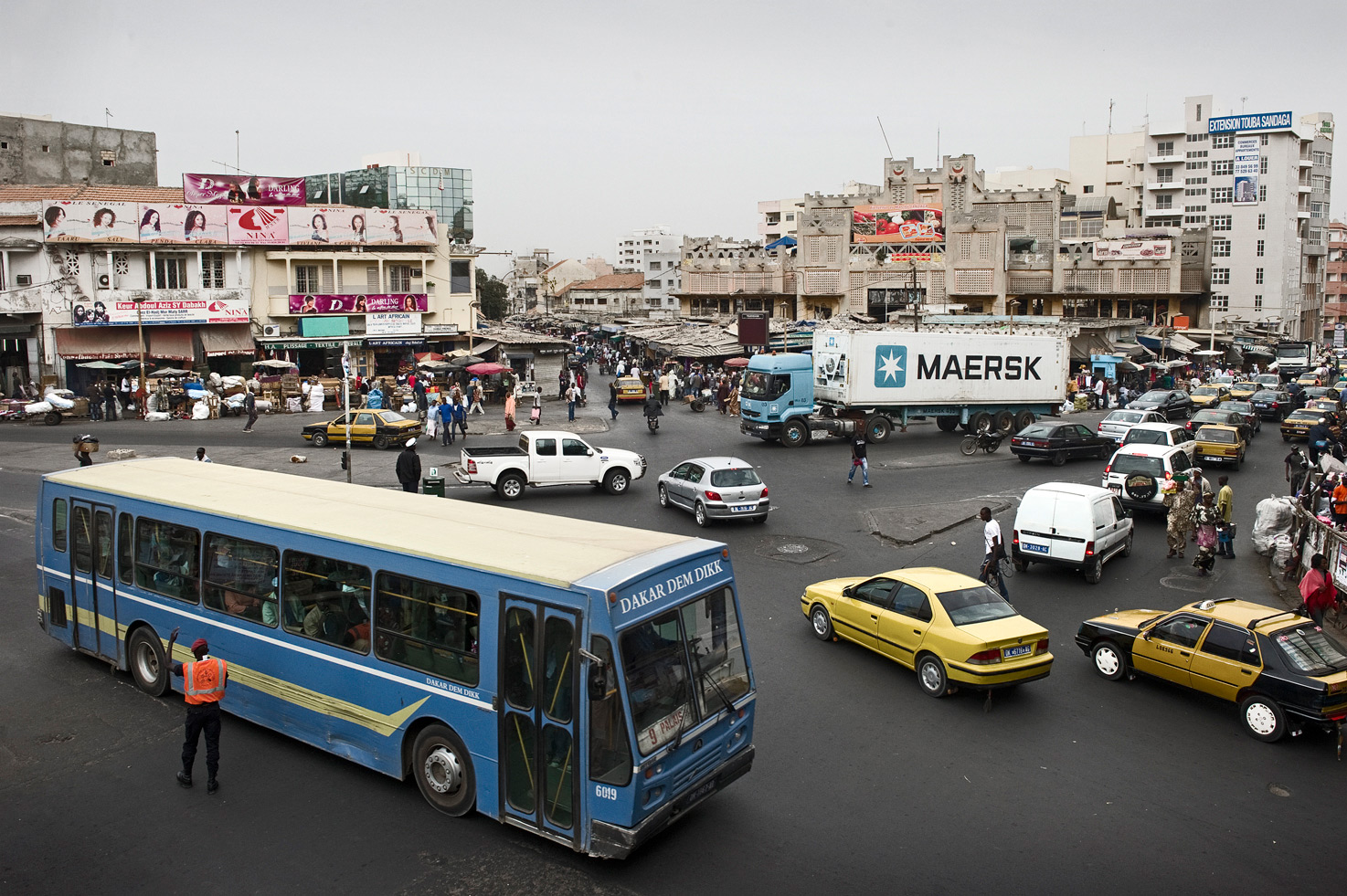
Traffic in Dakar.

Senegal has relatively low per capita emissions in the African context, with 0.67–0.68 t CO_{2} per inhabitant in 2022, higher than many sub-Saharan African countries, but well below the largest continental emitters such as Seychelles (10.33 t) and Libya (8.39 t).

The energy sector is the main source of greenhouse gas emissions in the country, accounting for approximately 30% of the total in 2022, remaining dominant through 2022 in the face of growing demand and dependence on fossil fuels. Transportation is a major contributor, both due to the size of the road transport sector —with over 600,000 vehicles, 59% of which are diesel- powered, and a road network in which less than 40% is paved—and due to its aging fleet and the deficit in railways and airport infrastructure. These factors made the sector responsible for approximately 28% of energy-related emissions in 2022.

=== Energy context ===
The Senegalese energy sector remains heavily dependent on fossil fuels, with oil accounting for nearly half of the country's total energy supply. Renewable sources—primarily traditional biomass (waste and biofuels) plus solar and wind —make up just over a third of the total energy supply, representing approximately 36–40%.

Much of the renewable energy use comes from the domestic consumption of biomass and waste for cooking and electricity generation in rural and peri-urban communities. In 2019, approximately 36% of final energy consumption in Senegal came from biomass (firewood, charcoal, and agricultural waste), an essential practice for millions of households but which highlights the importance of solid biofuels in the country's renewable energy matrix. However, the use of urban and agricultural waste in waste-to-energy facilities is controversial. Several studies indicate that, despite converting waste into energy, these plants release toxic pollutants—such as dioxins, furans, and heavy metals —and generate highly contaminating ash, questioning their classification as a truly renewable source and their role in sustainable development strategies.

By January 2025, Senegal's electricity access rate reached around 84%, ranking among the highest in the region. However, this coverage presents significant inequalities: in 2022, 97% of the urban population was connected to the electricity grid, compared to only 55% of the rural population.

In 2023, Senegal figured as a significant importer of refined and crude oil, with purchases totaling US$3 billion; Nigeria was the main supplier, accounting for approximately US$1.02 billion of that amount.

=== Economic context ===
Senegal had a population of around 18.08 million inhabitants in 2023 and a nominal GDP of 30.84 billion US dollars, reflecting solid economic growth of 4.58% for the year.

In terms of financial inclusion, 56% of Senegalese adults had at least one account with a financial institution (bank, cooperative or mobile money service) in 2021, a figure that highlights significant progress since 2011, driven mainly by the adoption of mobile money in urban and rural areas.

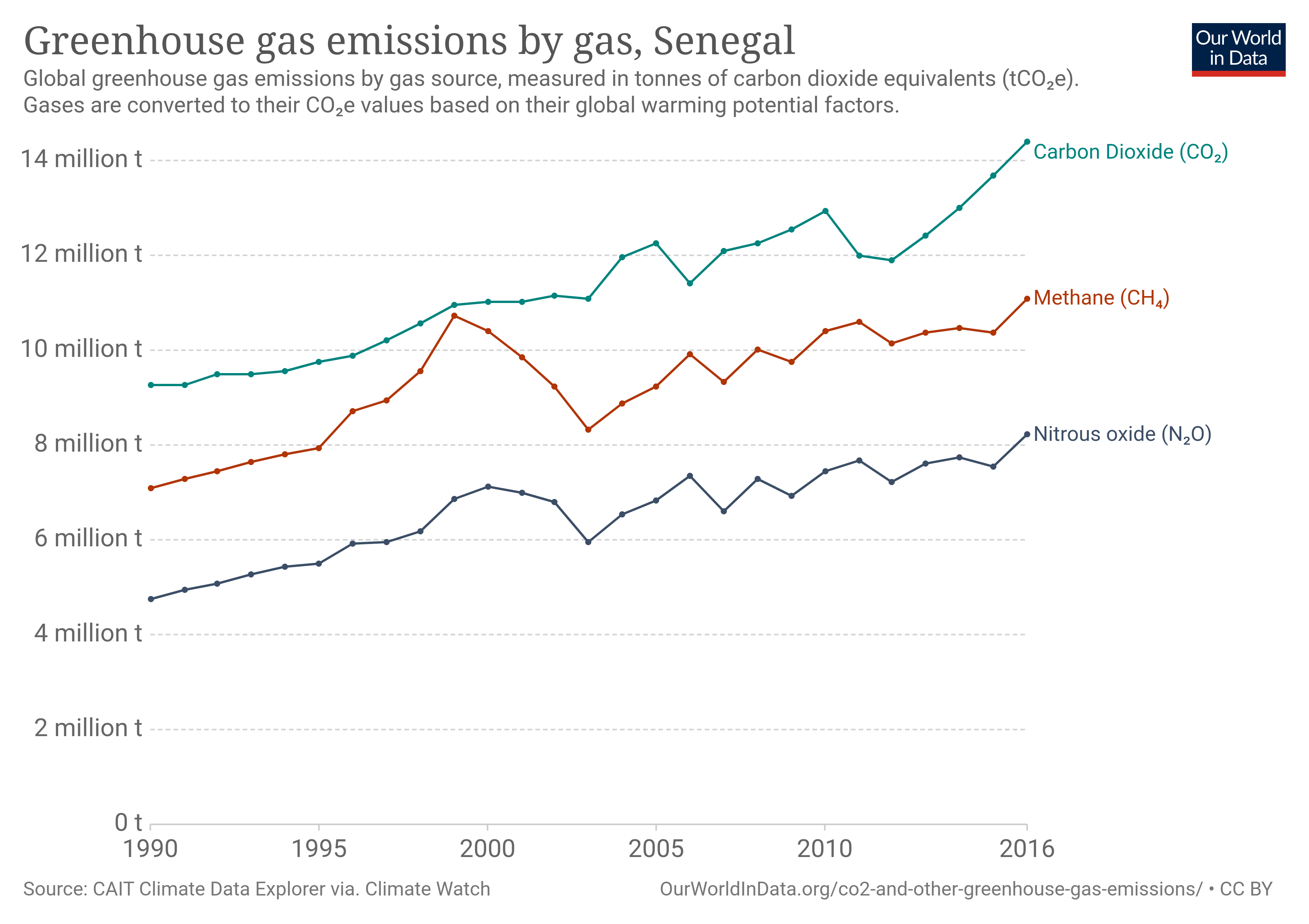
Greenhouse gas emissions in Senegal (in English).

== Legal and institutional frameworks ==
In its 2020 Nationally Determined Contribution (NDC), Senegal committed to reducing its greenhouse gas emissions by 7% by 2030 under the unconditional scenario, with an emphasis on strengthening the agriculture and forestry sectors, expanding renewable energy, and increasing energy efficiency throughout the economy. To meet these climate targets, the NDC estimates financing needs of US$8.7 billion for mitigation actions and US$4.3 billion for adaptation, totaling US$13 billion over the 2020–2030 period.

To attract foreign investment, Senegal has simplified procedures that centralizes business licensing and registration, in addition to digitizing tax and customs processes. These reforms—provided for in the new Investment Code—have reduced the timeframes for connecting to the electricity grid and obtaining permits, increasing predictability for international investors. In Senegal, the Investment and Major Projects Promotion Agency (APIX) serves as a "one-stop shop" for foreign investors, providing guidance on opportunities, procedures, and benefits of the Investment Code. APIX is responsible for receiving requests for approval under the code, monitoring approved projects and, facilitating access to tax and customs incentives provided for by national legislation.

The Plan Sénégal Émergent (PSE), adopted in February 2014, establishes a long-term development strategy to transform Senegal into an emerging economy by 2035. Structured around three pillars—structural transformation of the economy, human development, and good governance—the PSE sets ambitious annual growth targets of 7–8% and mobilizes public and private investment to modernize infrastructure, diversify key sectors (such as agriculture, agro-industry, and tourism), and strengthen social cohesion. The Priority Action Plans (PAP), which detail five-year phases of PSE implementation, define concrete steps toward sustainable growth. Short-term objectives include universal access to electricity, supported by grid expansion projects and financing partnerships aimed at reducing regional coverage gaps and strengthening the resilience of the energy system. The PES explicitly recognizes that sustainable finance is a key element in achieving its economic growth and social development objectives.

The 2004 Investment Code grants companies that make qualified investments (above 100 million CFA francs) exemption from import duties on capital goods, suspension of VAT payment during the investment period — with collection in the operational phase — and corporate income tax credit for a limited period, in addition to temporary exemption from the employer contribution (CFCE) on new hires.

To further boost capital attraction, the government created five special economic zones (SEZs) in Diass, Diamniadio, Sandiara, Bargny-Sendou, and Bélé-Kidira, offering preferential tax regimes, ready infrastructure, simplified customs clearance, and streamlined administrative procedures. The strategic plan calls for expansion to 45 SEZs in all regions of the country, with the potential to generate three million long-term jobs.

The 2019 Petroleum Law established stricter environmental obligations for investors in the hydrocarbon sector, requiring each petroleum title holder to post a bond with a financial institution to finance the rehabilitation and restoration of extraction sites upon termination of operations.

Recognizing the need to create carbon pricing mechanisms, the government began studies to implement a revenue-neutral carbon tax targeting the electricity, oil, and gas sectors. National and international consultants have pointed out that a "revenue-neutral" approach would facilitate the use of the instrument without burdening the public budget, while also incentivizes emissions reductions.

In March 2021, the country modernized its legal framework for public-private partnerships through Law No. 2021-23 (March 2, 2021), which repealed the previous 2014 regime. The new law expands the scope of PPPs—incorporating user-paid contracts and public service delegations—strengthens local content requirements, and simplifies the process, making these partnerships more attractive and accessible to the private sector.

== Private financing ==
Senegal has been consolidating itself as one of the main venture capital hubs in Francophone Africa. According to the Ecofin Agency, in 2021 the country joined the group of three nations that accounted for almost half (49%) of the transactions in the private equity sector in the region, second only to Morocco in the number of closed deals and surpassing competitors such as Ivory Coast and the Democratic Republic of the Congo.

The private capital market in Senegal has been increasing its involvement in renewable energy projects, highlighted by the development of the Niakhar Solar Station in the Fatick department. Led by Energy Resources Senegal (ERS) in association with Climate Fund Managers (CFM), an independent investment fund based in South Africa, the project comprises a 30 MW solar park coupled with a 15 MW/45 MWh storage system, costing approximately US$40 million.

Beyond the energy sector, private microfinance institutions have introduced climate-sensitive financial products to support rural communities. CAURIE Microfinance, for example, manages a loan portfolio of approximately US$27 million, serving 77,000 borrowers—78% of whom are women—and integrates a climate risk management policy through the YAPU digital platform, which assesses weather conditions in real time to guide credit approval for resilient agriculture.

== International cooperation and external financing ==
Senegal has relied on strong government support and the backing of international partners to accelerate its energy transition. In June 2023, the country formalized a Just Energy Transition Partnership (JETP) with France, Germany, the European Union, the United Kingdom, and Canada, securing a US$2.8 billion package to expand renewables and reduce emissions from the electricity sector. Under the agreement, Senegal committed to increasing the share of renewable energy to 40% of installed capacity by 2030.

Membership in the West African Economic and Monetary Union (WAEMU), which shares the CFA franc and harmonized macroeconomic policies, offers Senegal access to an integrated market of over 110 million consumers, greater exchange rate stability, and the potential for long-term project financing through institutions such as the BCEAO and the West African Development Bank (BOAD).

The Kolda solar park is expected to reach 60 MW, making it the largest solar plant among the eight currently operating in the country. Its development was made possible by an international consortium that included the Emerging Africa & Asia Infrastructure Fund (EAAIF), the Dutch development bank FMO, and the German investment institution DEG.

In line with the goal of universal access to electricity, the Green Climate Fund co-financed in 2020 a program by the Senegalese Agency for Rural Electrification (ASER) to install 1,000 solar mini-grids in isolated communities and avoid more than 45,000 tCO_{2} per year.

== Main sectors benefited ==
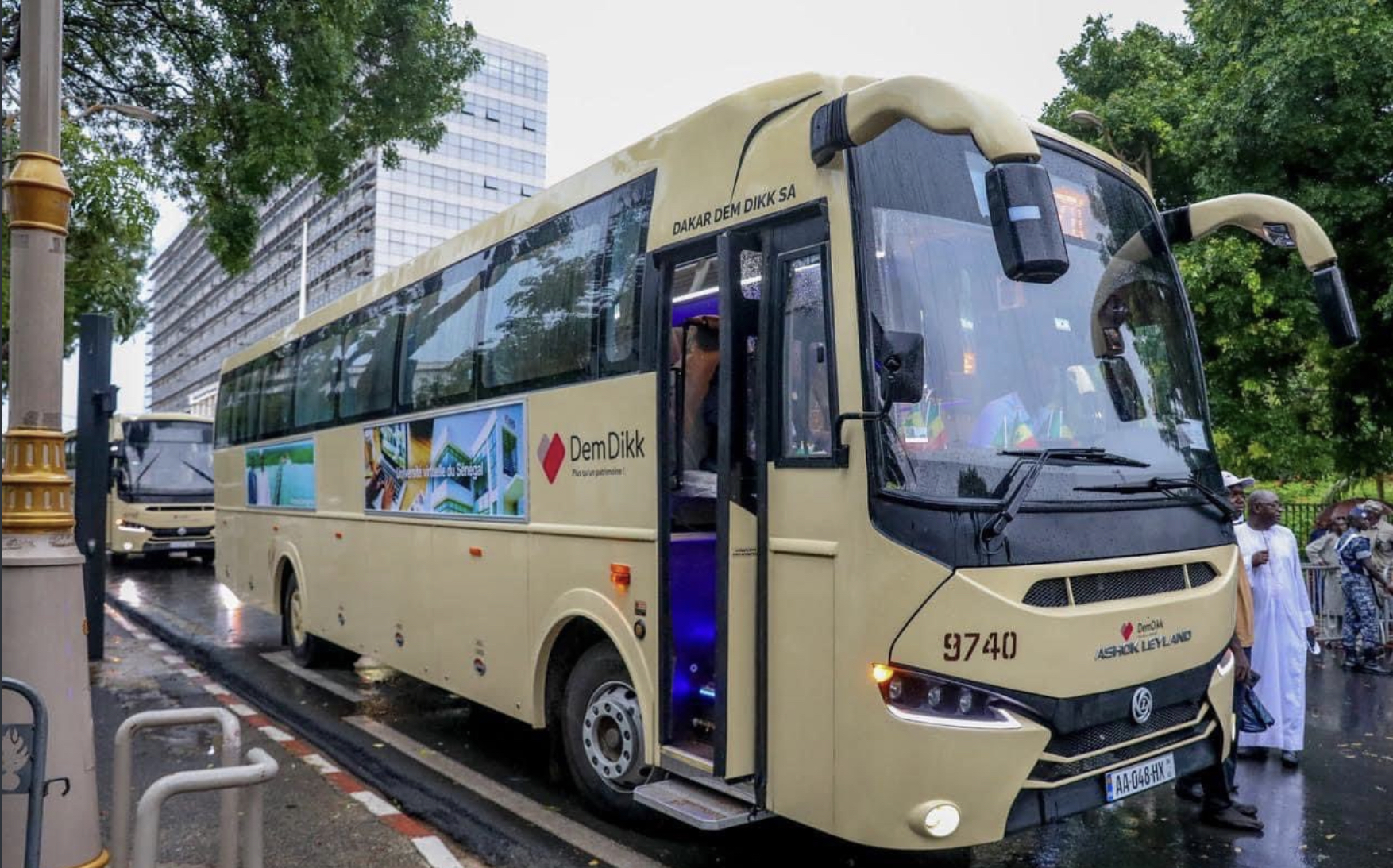
Public transport in Dakar, 2021.

The agricultural sector receives a significant volume of climate finance resources, with $412.5 million earmarked for climate-smart family farming initiatives.

In water resources management, $386.4 million was allocated to drinking water supply projects. Furthermore, between 1996 and 2023, the Senegalese government invested more than $1.3 billion in its drinking water supply system, focusing on the Dakar – Mbour – Thieès triangle.

In the renewable energy and sustainable transport sector, investments have supported the expansion of clean energy and low-emission urban mobility systems, including the Bus Rapid Transit pilot in Dakar; such actions can increase agricultural yields by up to 20% and reduce air pollutants.

Coastal protection and disaster risk management includes $61.3 million for flood risk reduction programs and $72.9 million for stormwater management, which will strengthen early warning systems, containment infrastructure, and restore coastal ecosystems for 169,200 households.

== Impacts and results ==
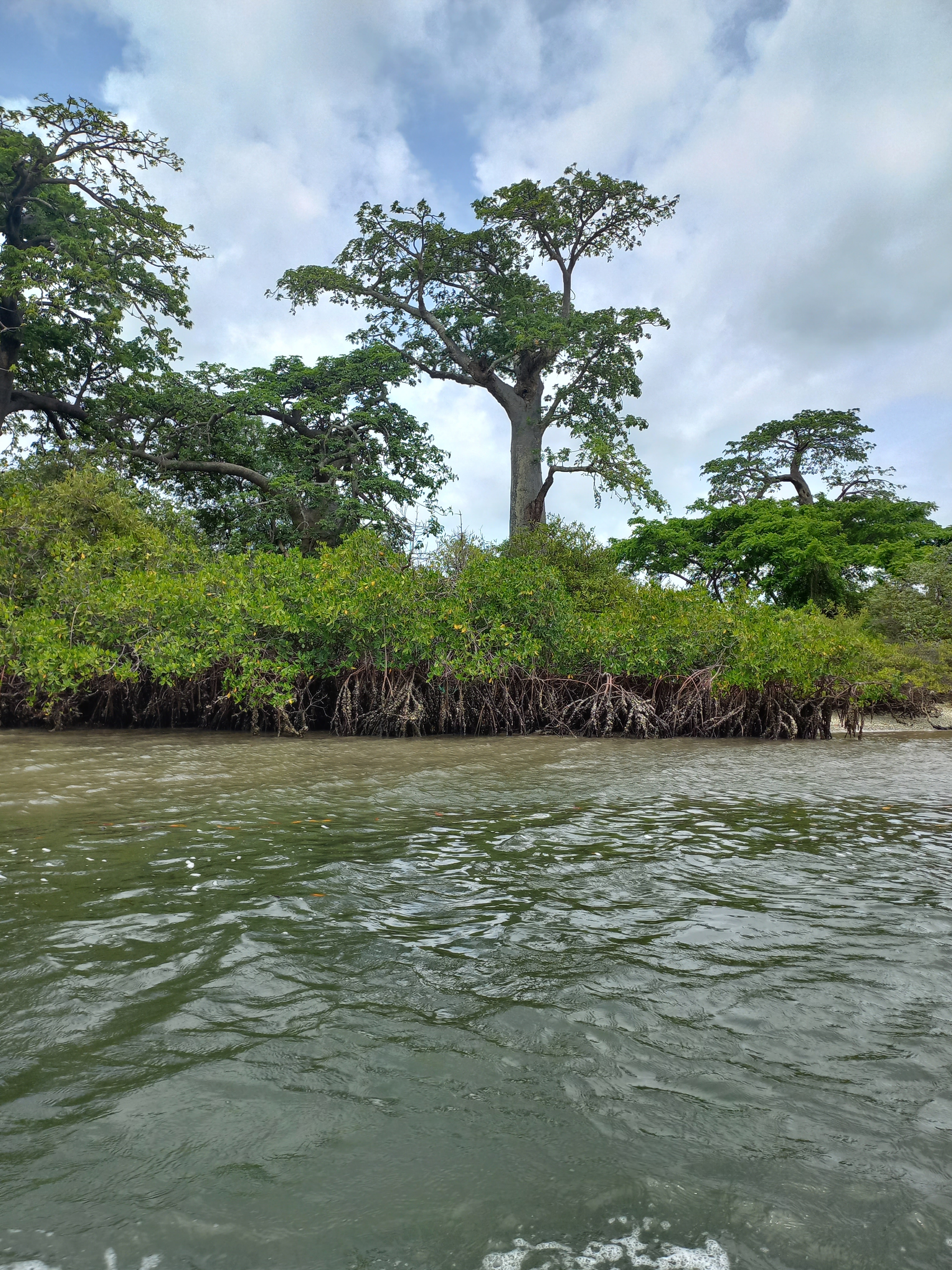
Mangroves in the Saloum Delta .

In terms of installed capacity, renewable energy already totals around 0.4 GW in the country. In 2022, this renewable capacity surpassed that of coal in electricity generation, with solar and wind farms jointly representing 21% of the electricity produced that year. Within this total, one of the main contributors is wind farms, whose main project — the Taïba N'Diaye plant — has 158.7 MW in operation since 2021. Hydroelectric development in the country is also relevant, with the hydroelectric potential of the Senegal River basin estimated at 1,200 MW, of which around 260 MW are already in operation.

Mangrove restoration in the Saloum Delta stands out as one of the most significant results of climate finance projects in Senegal: a community-led initiative led by Wetlands International and partners restored 1,600 hectares of mangroves between 2023 and 2025, strengthening coastal protection, improving water quality, and increasing local biodiversity.

The LED Lamp Promotion Program (PPLEEF), financed by the African Development Bank and implemented in public-private partnership, has already benefited more than 700,000 households and 80,000 businesses in Dakar, Thiès and Diourbel.

== Criticism and controversies ==
Although the 2004 Investment Code ensures, in Articles 9 and 10, identical treatment to foreign and domestic investors—including freedom of ownership, concessions, and access to public markets—some foreign companies report, in practice, that the business environment favors incumbents and established players, facing excessive bureaucratic processes, non-transparent decisions, and opaque bidding criteria that hinder the entry of new investors.

In 2023, investment in clean energy infrastructure in Senegal totaled US$787.08 million, representing a 38.56% decrease compared to the US$1.28 billion invested in 2022. This decline interrupts the growth trend of recent years, when the country reached its peak investment in 2022. One possible explanation for this decline is the strengthening of the Senegalese government's gas-to-power strategy, as outlined in its Integrated Plan at Least Cost (IPCC). Senegal has been promoting the replacement of fuel oil (HFO) generation with natural gas-fired thermoelectric plants, seeking to reduce the cost of electricity and the fossil fuel import bill, which may have diverted some of the financing previously directed to renewable projects.

Several experts and organizations warn that Senegal's predominant climate finance model, based on loans, could worsen public debt. According to research by Oxfam, 85% of the resources allocated to the country between 2013 and 2021 were granted in the form of debt, increasing the level of financial vulnerability in a context where public debt already approaches 62% of gross national income. Taking advantage of this dynamic, countries and multilateral banks account for loans at face value as concessions, artificially inflating the achievement of climate finance targets without disbursing direct subsidies.

== Future prospects ==
Solar radiation levels between 4.2 and 6 kWh/m²/day across nearly 90% of the territory, combined with average coastal wind speeds of 4 to 7 m/s, position Senegal to rapidly scale its photovoltaic and wind farm capacity towards the target of 40% renewables in generation by 2030.

Senegal has significant solar photovoltaic potential, estimated at 37,233 MW of technical capacity, according to data from the International Renewable Energy Agency (IRENA). As for wind, the offshore potential is even more significant: the World Bank estimates between 13 GW of bottom-fixed (Note: This figure refers to bottom-fixed wind turbine installations, which are anchored directly to the seabed in shallower waters.) and 32 GW of floating wind, (Note: Floating wind turbines are suited for deeper waters where fixed foundations are not feasible, expanding potential offshore wind capacity.) totaling around 45 GW of capacity, capable of complementing solar generation and reducing seasonality in electricity supply.

== See also ==
- Climate change in Africa
- Climate change in Kenya
- Climate finance in Nigeria
