= Climate finance in Cameroon =

Climate finance in Cameroon comprises a mixture of the Forest Investment Program (FIP), domestic, and internationally sourced funding for climate change sustainability, control, and resilience. As Cameroon is built on the coastal regions with the highest risk of flood mortality, its economic resources of agriculture, on which 60% of its population relies, are shaken. This attracts the question of climate finance to salvage livelihood and security. According to the United Nations Development Programme (UNDP), countries need more finance for their climate targets than they can source domestically. It also reported that in 2009, high-income countries with a significant historical contribution to climate change committed to raising US$100 billion annually by 2020 to fund climate action in low-income countries.

Thus, in African countries like Cameroon, climate funds become an important source of finance to manage the climate crisis. The report from UNDP stated that 50 percent of mitigation financing tracked in Africa between 2011-2021 came from MDBs ($37 billion) and 45 percent from bilateral sources ($33.47 billion). It should be remembered that Cameroon signed the Global Methane Pledge to reduce global methane emissions by at least 30% from 2020 levels by 2030. The World Bank on Climate Change and Development Report (CCDR) in Cameroon, estimated the GDP loss to range from 4 to 10 percent in the most pessimistic scenario by 2050 if no action is taken. The indication is that climate change will also increase the balance of payments needs and require fiscal space.

Cameroon faces challenges in its climate finance mitigation. A study carried out by Lueong and Suiven on in-depth understanding and knowledge on the different tools, effectiveness, and challenges affecting climate finance in Cameroon, reported diverse funding sources, international climate funds, bilateral agreements, and national budget allocations. Another research stated that Cameroon's major challenge is inadequate financial resources to mitigate climate change.

== Government finance of climate in Cameroon ==
Initially, Cameroon did not include funding or fine mechanisms in its budget. The Country Climate and Development Report (CCDR) stated that two million people (nine percent of Cameroon's population) live in drought-affected areas, and about eight percent of the country's GDP is vulnerable, thus, making a pathway for more rapid inclusive, sustainable economic growth from stakeholders. The effort is to salvage the poverty rate which is expected to be about 15 percent in 2050. This is also seen as above the global target of three percent.

Cameroon has a CIF's investment through its Forest Investment Program (FIP) which designed its activities to cover the adaptation and mitigation efforts, increasing carbon stocks and restoring degraded landscapes. The government established FEICOM: A Public Economic and Financial Establishment in December 1974. It becomes the administration for the local development of funds for climate. It is allowed to access the Green Climate Fund (GCF) in Cameroon. FEICOM signed a memorandum of understanding with the Covenant of Mayors in Sub-Saharan Africa (CoM SSA) to support Cameroonian municipalities to mitigate climate change and access to funding.

However, a statement by ICLEI Africa in 2024, declared that "less than 3% of climate finance flows to Africa." The report calls for the local administration and city governments to be part of the decision-making on how climate finance is spent, especially as the impacts are felt in their localities. Hence the BRIDGE project team takes up a learning lab in Yaoundé (Cameroon) to train researchers, selected municipalities, over 30 knowledge brokers, and representatives from the Special Fund for Intercommunal Equipment and Intervention (FEICOM). The National government with the technical and financial partners were also part of the training. The training included online and physical events.

== International financiers ==
In 2024, Cameroon received a Resilience and Sustainability Facility (RSF) arrangement from the International Monetary Fund (IMF) Executive Board. This money amounts to US$183.4 million in the exchange rate. This was meant to give redress to other expensive finances and encourage other stakeholders to support with their funds in saving Cameroon's climate challenges. It should be recalled that in 2021 the IMF extended the Credit Facility and Fund Facility to Cameroon with SDR 483 million an equivalent of US$689.5 to support the country's economic and financial reform program.

In 2023 the IMF completed the Fifth Reviews of the Extended Credit Facility (ECF) and the Extended Fund Facility (EFF) arrangements to Cameroon with the disbursement of about US$73.8 million. This helped Cameroon's economic reform program foster structural transformation, boost growth and resilience, and integrate climate agenda in institutional and budget frameworks.

Similarly in October 2023, the African Development Bank Group approved €203.11 million loan for Cameroon. This was to be used for the Land-Use Development and Promotion of the Private Sector Project in the Far North region. Under the same project, the European Union also supported with a €30-million grant from the EU-Africa Infrastructure Trust Fund to enable the country to become an integrated and sustainable development hub in the region.

In 2021 the U.S. government had a series of supports for climate change mitigation in Africa including Cameroon. These included $1.1 million in support of climate change mitigation in the Dja-Odzala-Minkébé Landscape in Gabon, the Republic of the Congo, and Cameroon. The United States also contributed $60 million to the Global Environment Facility (GEF) which the African Development Bank implemented as resources in the Lake Chad Basin including Cameroon. This was to promote the conservation of water and forest ecosystems, energy efficiency and food security in the region.

== Paris Agreement ==
The endorsement of the Paris Agreement in 2015 created opportunities to safeguard climate change for Sustainable Development Goals (SDGs), economic growth and improvement of livelihoods. As the agreement indicates Nationally Determined Contributions (NDCs) of the country's strategy on building resilience, Cameroon submitted its instrument of ratification against the negative effects of a changing climate. It also established the Nationally Determined Contribution (NDC) with the development partners supporting the global efforts to control climate change. At the COP21, Cameroonian president Paul Biya stated, "it is necessary to draw up a financing schedule to ensure that partners in the agreement meet their commitments."
