= Climate finance in Ghana =

Climate finance in Ghana includes a mixture of domestic and internationally sourced funding for climate change adaptation, mitigation and resilience.

== Nationally determined contributions ==
Ghana is a party to the United Nations Framework Convention on Climate Change (UNFCCC) and has signed and ratified the Paris Agreement. In 2023, the Ghana Finance minister, Ken Ofori Atta informed the public that the Ministry of Finance is setting up a climate financing division to support climate finance in the country.

== Major financial support ==
According to the UNFCCC report of 2021, Ghana's climate finance recorded an average of 830 million USD between 2019 and 2020. The major financial support came from the public organizations. Institutions supporting climate finance in Ghana include the African Development Bank, the European Union, and the United States of America.

Ghana as a member of the Climate Vulnerable Forum (CVF) and The Vulnerable Twenty Group (V20), a group of 68 countries that are vulnerable to climate change issues has also pushed for the creation of fit-for-climate financial scheme to tackle climate finance issues.

The country's domestic budget and the Multilateral Development Financial Institutions also contributed to the climate finance in Ghana.
