= Deforestation in Kenya =

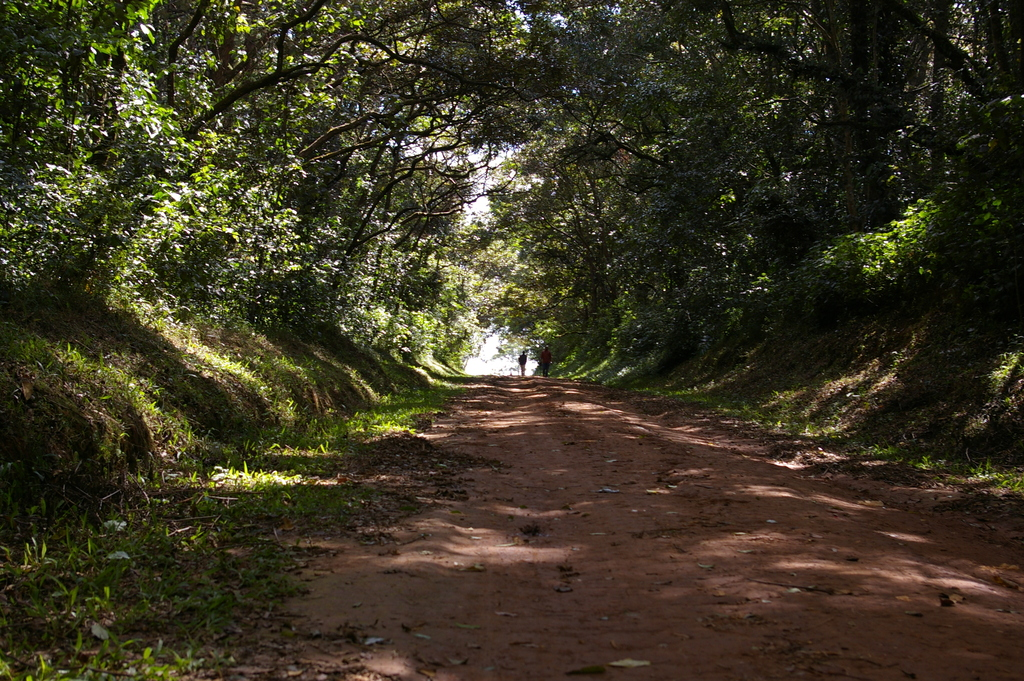
Kakamega rain forest located in Nandi county, Kenya

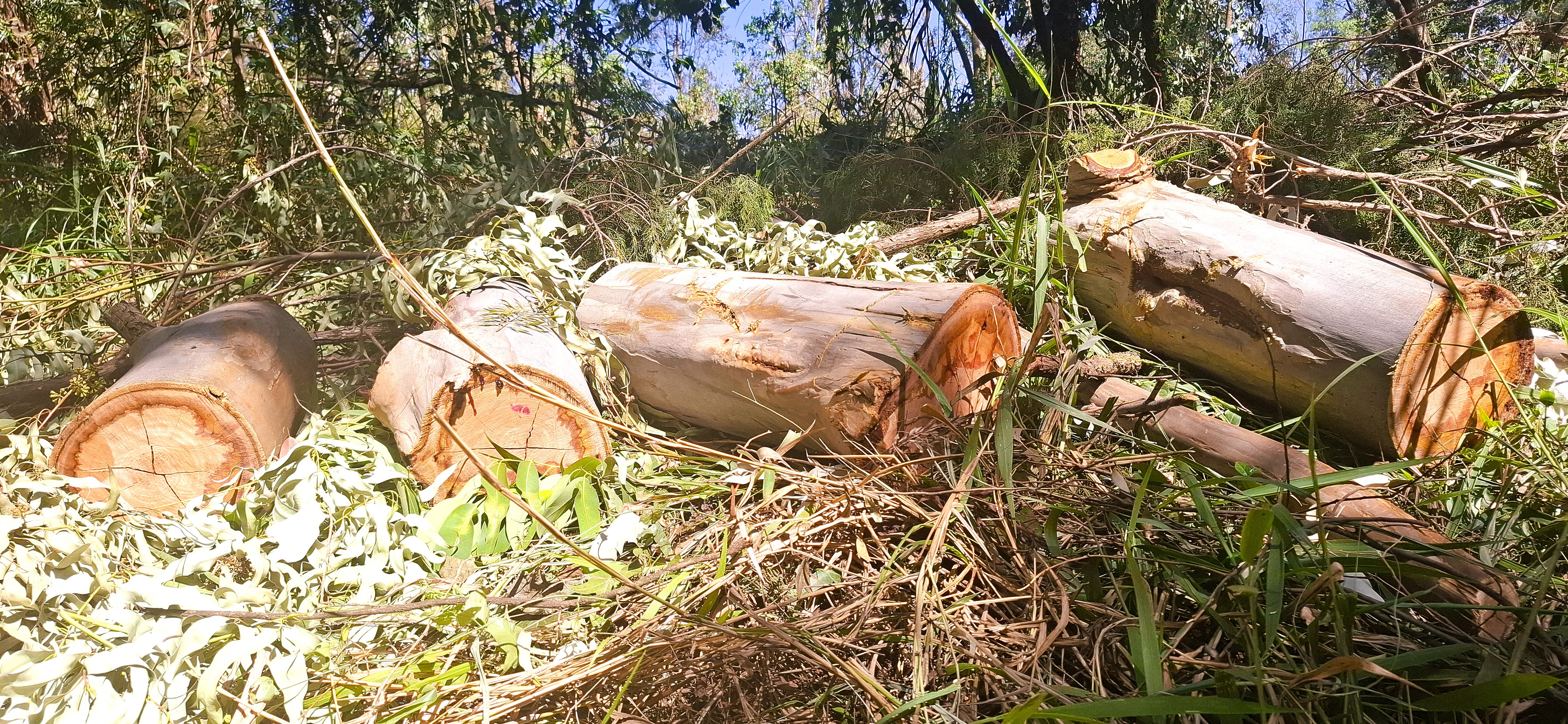
Logging in Karura forest-Nairobi, Kenya

Kenya's forests are fragmented across the country. Combined, forests cover over 37 million hectares. Out of those 37 million hectares, 2.1 million are woodlands, 24.8 million are bush lands and 10.7 are wooded grasslands. Kenya's forests are important at a global level as they host 1847 species of amphibians, birds, mammals, and reptiles of which 4% are only found in Kenya. Beyond its fauna, Kenya's forest also hosts 6505 types of vascular plants, with 4.1% only being found in Kenya. Today Kenya faces high rates of deforestation which endanger both its fauna and flora. It has been estimated that since Kenya's independence in 1963, the forest cover has dropped from 10% of the nation to 6%, losing approximately 12,000 hectares annually. These levels of deforestation have impacted Kenya as they rely on the forest for the storage of rainwater, the prevention of flooding, the fertility of the soil, and the regulation of climate conditions. The World War II period and its aftermath made it clear to British colonial administration that reform was needed to sustain Kenyan forests. One of the first steps for conservation took place with the 1941 revision of the Forest Ordinance that passed legislation to create forest reserves and create a committee with professionals on matters of conservation. By 1950, the forest department had gained control of 100,000 acres, but it had a difficult time sustaining the conservation of these areas; it required meaningful policy to meet the constant attention these areas needed.

As the independence of Kenya approached, its forest continued to degrade in part due to the land demand from the growing population. By the beginning of the 19th century, the population in Kenya stood at 1,7 million, which increased to 8.5 million by 1962. The desired land that could be used for farming was in the forests; thus, deforestation increased. Demand for wood fuel increased in urban areas such as Nairobi, Kisumu, and Mombasa. After Kenya gained its independence in 1963, the efforts to resolve deforestation continued but fell short. Some of the methods taken during the period included the recruitment of Canadian and British experts to manage the forest. The Canadian Overseas Assistance Programme assisted Kenya by training its foresters and provided a 5-week tour in Canadian forests to Kenyan conservators, as both share the timber industry.

== Contemporary causes ==
For the last two decades, the challenges Kenyan Forest faces are still similar to its long history of deforestation. Some of the current drivers that are increasing deforestation categorize into technological, economic, and cultural types. The drivers that are qualified as technological are mostly the lack of knowledge about the impacts of deforestation and the lack of appropriate technology required for three growing. The economic drivers are poverty leading to reliance on charcoal fuel and the usage of woodland for crops. As for the cultural challenges, one can classify the usage of fire for land clearing and the inability to control these fires.

Agricultural expansion continues to impact the Mau forest in Kenya. The area experiences massive deforestation to grow commercial tea and wheat. The forest of Migori and more western areas use the land for sugar, while forest in areas in Nyanza is used for tobacco. Wood extraction also contributes to deforestation, but data has been systematically not collected by the Kenya Forest Service and the Ministry of Energy to prevent it from stopping. Most of the deforestation by wood extraction occurs in the dry woodlands of the coast, while wood extraction for charcoal and fuel occurs on locations nearby metropolitan areas where the demand exists. Another factor that contributes to the deforestation in Kenya is infrastructural developments. Roads, railways, and dams lead to deforestation as they create new settlements that cause a demand in land and resources from the forested areas.

== Measured rates of deforestation ==
During the last two decades of the 21st century, Kenya's rate of deforestation has remained consistent. The first decade of the century experienced 2,914.55 hectares in a primary forest lost and 19,401 hectares lost in tree cover while the second decade of the century has experienced a total of 2,099.74 hectares lost in primary forest and 17,167 hectares lost in tree cover.

Year	Primary Forest Lost (Ha)	Tree Cover Lost (Ha)
2002	2,974	20,399
2003	1,568	13,621
2004	2,974	17,053
2005	1,703	17,053
2006	3,340	20,743
2007	3,440	26,213
2008	1,887	19,296
2009	1,596	17,750
2010	6,749	22,770
2011	1,410	17,364
2012	1,664	17,977
2013	1,623	13,622
2014	1,210	15,404
2015	3,055	15,654
2016	2,052	19,114
2017	3,134	22,235
2018	2,649	15,965

== Impacts ==
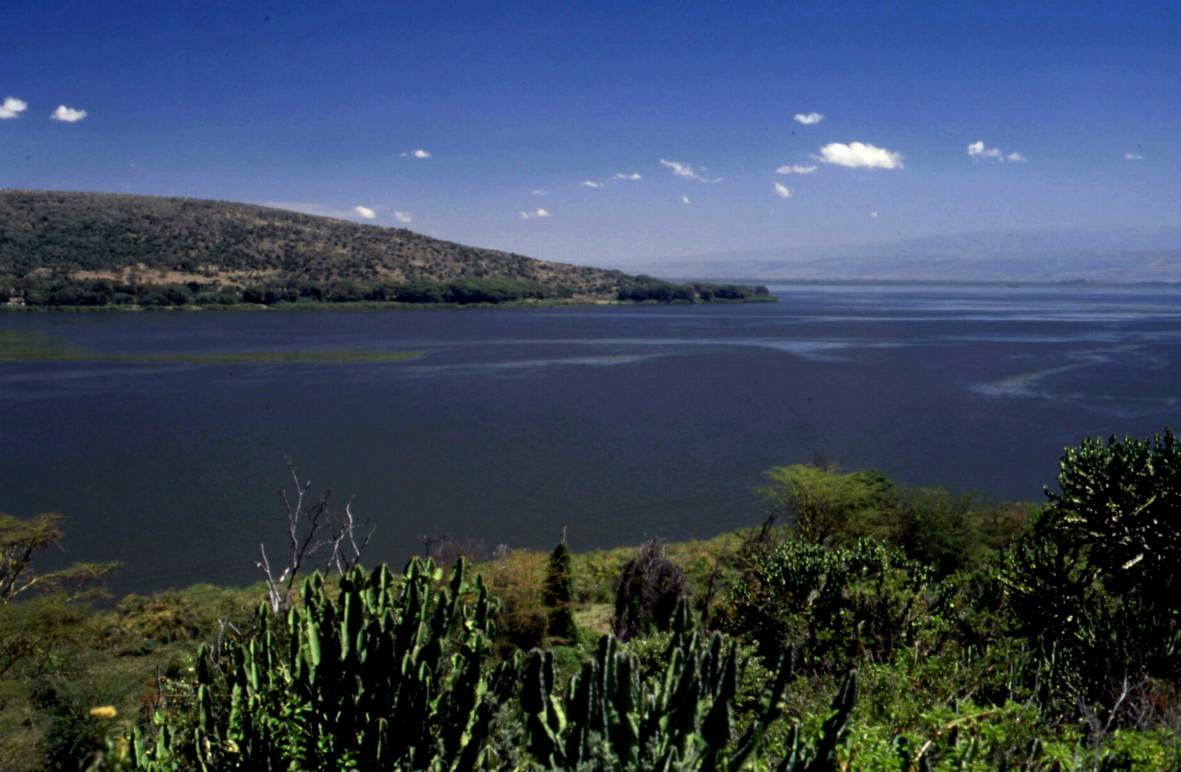
Lake Naivasha, Kenya

The impact of deforestation in the Kenyan water has been one of the most notorious; This is present in lake Naivasha and its surrounding communities. Lake Naivasha, located west of Nairobi, receives its water from the Aberdare Range where the rivers and streams that originate in the mountains are the source of water in the lakes. The forest in the Aberdares mountains traps moisture and keeps temperatures cool, provides cloud cover, and creates the rainfall that feeds the streams and rivers. The high levels of deforestation in the area have interrupted this natural cycle and affected several lakes such as Naivasha. With many trees in the Aberdares mountains gone, the forest is no longer trapping moisture or creating rainfall; thus, the water levels in Lake Naivasha have decreased. The scarcity of water has directly impacted flora and fauna of the region and also impacted local communities whose source of water is lakes such as Naivasha.

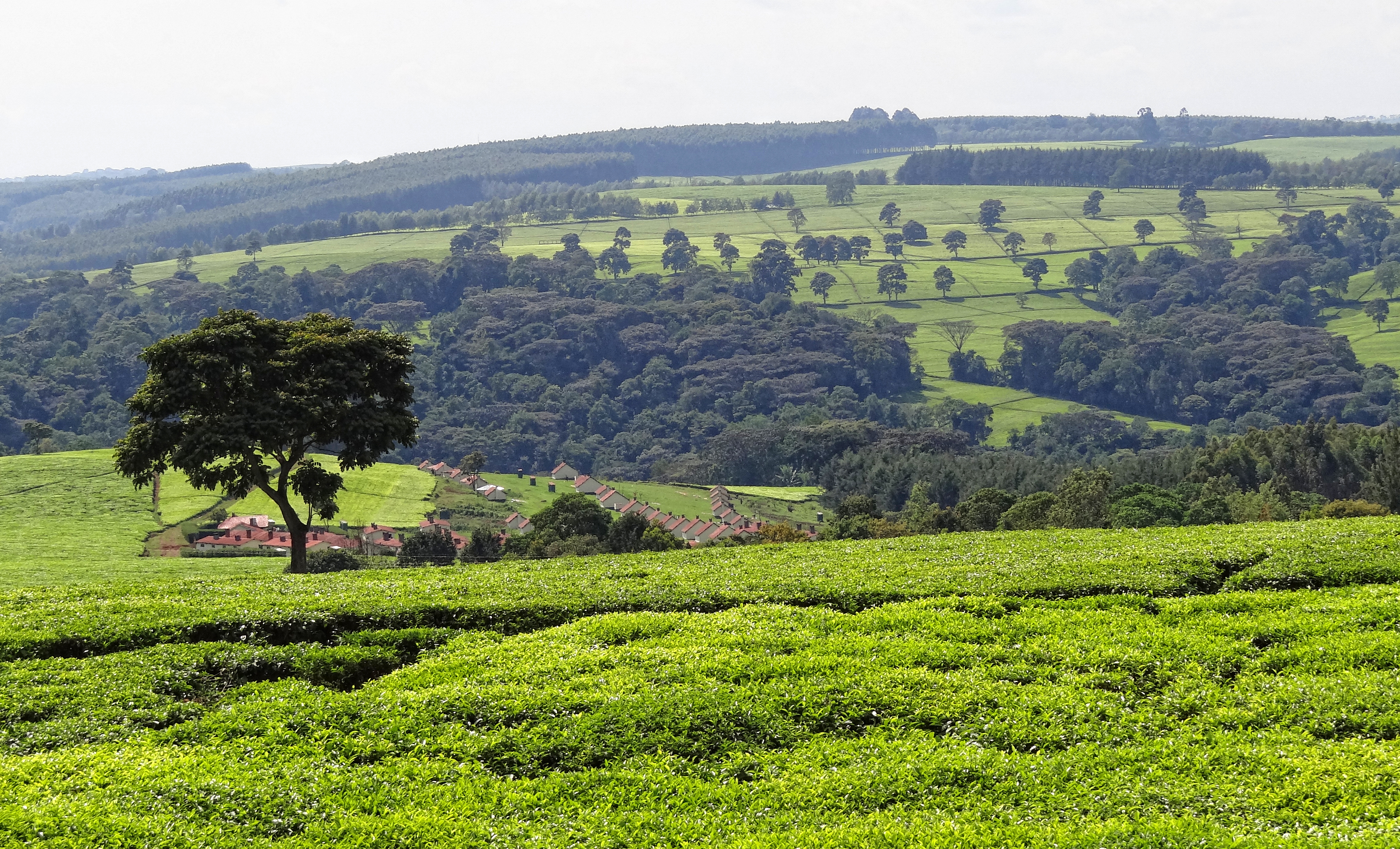
Western Kenyan highlands located in Kericho

Deforestation in Kenya, specifically in the Mara river basin, has also caused soil erosion and an increase in flooding. Deforestation increases land erosion because forests help hold in place essential nutrients in the soil. From the early ’70s to the early 2000s, the savannah, grassland, and shrub-land in the Mara river basin have decreased by 27% in part due to agricultural land usages doubling during the same period. As a result, land erosion has increased in the upper catchment area while lower areas have experienced an increase in flood by 7% and a 387% increase in Mara wetland during the same period that deforestation increased.

The high rates of deforestation have increased temperatures in Kenya, thus also increasing the likelihood of malaria transmission. Deforestation rates in western Kenyan highlands directly affect the temperature in the area and alter the larval habitat, thus increasing their chances of survival and development. Deforested areas in western Kenyan highlands have increased in temperature by 0.5 °C in 10 months while the average temperature of houses in the area has increased 1.8 and 1.2 °C during the same period. Additionally, the deforested areas are used for Maize cultivation in which larvae can feed and, as a result, grow into more significant adults and increase the likelihood of transmission. These conditions directly doubled rates of malaria mosquitos in Kenya from 0.22 to 0.33 and during the rainy season from 0.1 to 0.12, representing a 50% increase in the dry season and a 20% increase during the rainy season.

== Response ==
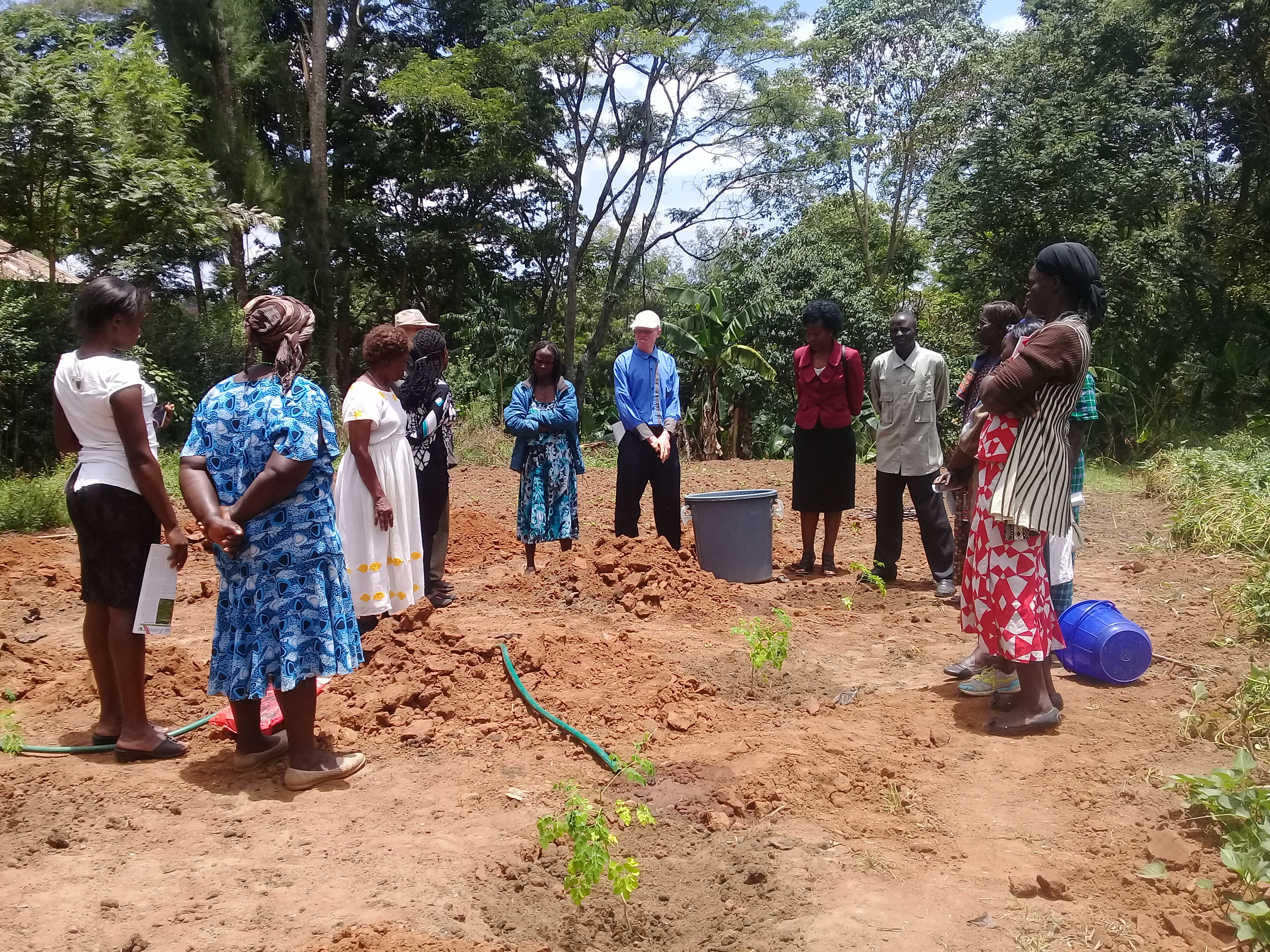
Kenyan community members planting trees

As a result of high deforestation rates and its negative impacts, the Kenyan government has made efforts to stop it. The first signs of forest conservation in Kenya happened in 1957 with a policy that sought to preserve the forest in order to protect water catchments and promote sustainable development of the forest industry. As a result of research and detailed data, in the early 2000s, the Kenyan government further pursued the protection of forests by enacting a policy that both addresses socioeconomic and environmental challenges. One of the most notorious examples being the 2005 Forest Act that continues to be an example of forest policy today. The 2005 Forest Act required public participation and collaboration with local communities to develop forest management plants while respecting their cultural traditions. In addition, the 2005 forest act acknowledged the ability of sustainable practices to reduce poverty and sustain necessary environmental resources.

More recently the Kenyan government has sought new legislation that further incorporates local communities and promotes economic development. Some critical aspects of today's forest reform include the creation of the Kenya Forest Service, public and professional involvement in resource management, creation of a conservation fund, and conservation of the complete forest ecosystem, which includes water, flora, and fauna. Additionally, other forest conservation efforts have been implemented with agricultural reform. The Kenyan Agriculture act included new measures that required every agricultural landholder to conserve 10% of forest cover in their land.

== Tree cover extent and loss ==
Global Forest Watch publishes annual estimates of tree cover loss and 2000 tree cover extent derived from time-series analysis of Landsat satellite imagery in the Global Forest Change dataset. In this framework, tree cover refers to vegetation taller than 5 m (including natural forests and tree plantations), and tree cover loss is defined as the complete removal of tree cover canopy for a given year, regardless of cause.

For Kenya, country statistics report cumulative tree cover loss of 400,390 ha (4,003.9 km^{2}) from 2001 to 2024 (about 12.1% of its 2000 tree cover area). For tree cover density greater than 30%, country statistics report a 2000 tree cover extent of 3,319,472 ha (33,194.72 km^{2}). The charts and table below display this data. In simple terms, the annual loss number is the area where tree cover disappeared in that year, and the extent number shows what remains of the 2000 tree cover baseline after subtracting cumulative loss. Forest regrowth is not included in the dataset.

Annual tree cover loss in Kenya, 2001–2024. View chart definition.
Tree cover extent in 2000 minus cumulative tree cover loss in Kenya, 2001–2024 (loss-only residual; does not account for gain). View chart definition.

Annual tree cover extent and loss
Year	Tree cover extent (km2) (Note: This residual measure does not include forest regrowth.)	Annual tree cover loss (km2)
2001	33,004.45	190.27
2002	32,801.58	202.87
2003	32,666.05	135.53
2004	32,496.17	169.88
2005	32,368.71	127.46
2006	32,162.15	206.56
2007	31,901.11	261.04
2008	31,708.88	192.23
2009	31,531.91	176.97
2010	31,304.98	226.93
2011	31,131.98	173.00
2012	30,952.98	179.00
2013	30,817.34	135.64
2014	30,663.78	153.56
2015	30,507.63	156.15
2016	30,317.14	190.49
2017	30,095.51	221.63
2018	29,936.43	159.08
2019	29,776.91	159.52
2020	29,586.46	190.45
2021	29,510.81	75.65
2022	29,444.42	66.39
2023	29,331.85	112.57
2024	29,190.82	141.03

== REDD+ forest reference level and monitoring ==
Kenya has submitted a national forest reference level (FRL) under the UNFCCC REDD+ framework, and its 2020 submission was subject to a UNFCCC technical assessment. On the UNFCCC REDD+ Web Platform, Kenya's 2020 submission is listed as having an assessed reference level, while the other Warsaw Framework elements—a national strategy, safeguards, and a national forest monitoring system—are listed as “not reported”.

Kenya's assessed national FRL covers four REDD+ activities: reducing emissions from deforestation, reducing emissions from forest degradation, sustainable management of forests, and enhancement of forest carbon stocks. For the reference period 2002–2018, the assessed FRL corresponds to 52,204,059 t CO2 eq per year, expressed as the average of historical emissions and removals. The technical assessment reports that the FRL includes above-ground and below-ground biomass and CO2 only, while excluding soil organic carbon, litter and deadwood.

The modified submission states that Kenya used a national forest definition of at least 0.5 hectares, at least 15% canopy cover and a minimum height of 2 metres, and that perennial tree crops such as coffee and tea are excluded from the forest definition. Activity data were derived from a time series of national land-cover maps produced with the System for Land-based Emission Estimation in Kenya (SLEEK) using Landsat imagery, while the technical assessment identified improving the SLEEK mapping programme and increasing permanent sample plots in the national forest inventory as areas for future technical improvement.

== See also ==
- Environmental issues in Kenya
- Corruption in Kenya
