= Climate finance in Zimbabwe =

Climate finance in Zimbabwe involves the national and international funding to assist climate change adaptation and mitigation initiatives.

There are now established local funding organizations like the Infrastructure Development Bank of Zimbabwe (IDBZ). By running the Climate Finance Facility (GFF), it offers a foundation of domestic financial resources. The government is also drafting a bill to address climate change.

Serious climate-related calamities are plaguing Zimbabwe, as they are most of Southern Africa.

== Causes of climate change and its impacts on the country ==
The nation is heavily impacted by this because it depends on industries like farming that are susceptible to climate change. Also, there are other local industries that are environmentally unfriendly in their modes of operation. This aggravates the impacts of climate change, thereby posing a challenge to climate financing.

The government of Zimbabwe is working to make communities better equipped to deal with the long-term effects of climate change and to reduce their vulnerability to it. Nevertheless, Zimbabwe lacks the resources to manage severe climate hazards, and it's unclear what policies to implement to improve financing for climate adaptation.

== Climate adaptation policy and financing framework in Zimbabwe ==
The availability of finances to finance adaptation and mitigation initiatives, as well as the regulation of climate finance, have been hotly disputed since the 2009 Climate Change Summit in Copenhagen. In many nations, the creation of climate change adaptation is seen as a crucial element of climate policy. Despite the arguments over the years, it has been very difficult for the country to contain the challenges of climate finance. Hence, Zimbabwe continues to face financial resource mobilization challenges, institutional inefficiencies, and regulatory obstacles that impede the best possible use of climate finance, notwithstanding international pledges and domestic regulations. However, as one of the developing countries and one of the mostly hit by climate change impacts, Zimbabwe is qualified for financial assistance from a number of climate funds because it is among the most climate-vulnerable nations. According to Fite, the nation must set up procedures and mechanisms to show that it is prepared to receive more climate funding. In order to better prepare for accessing climate money, Zimbabwe has been receiving assistance from the Green Climate Fund. Various organizations within the United Nations as well as multilateral development banks have provided Zimbabwe with climate funding thus far.

Dube (2022) reports that since 1991, Zimbabwe has spent almost $500 million on adaptation and mitigation of climate change. The money was used to support adaptation or mitigation efforts related to environmental preservation. Part of the funding for climate change comes from the Green Climate Fund, which has approved two projects totaling USD 35.4 million so far with the goal of helping the nation's agriculture industry adapt to climate change.
