= Climate finance in Democratic Republic of the Congo =

Climate finance in Democratic Republic of the Congo comprises a mixture of the Forest Investment Program (FIP), domestic and internationally sourced funding for climate change sustainability, control and resilience. DRC has high temperatures and decreases in precipitation, making it prone to floods and droughts. This is why climate change affects the population, agriculture, health and biological diversity, with a health risk of about 40%. DRC invested $10 million to enhance activities of forest preservation and the development of a green economy.

It is therefore imperative to source climate finance as 40 million people who depend on the Congo Basin for food, health, livelihoods and ecosystem services may likely experience hunger and poverty with more climate change.

The World Bank on the climate issue in DRC remarked that "economic losses could reach up to 17% of GDP by 2050 if reforms to diversify the economy and attract more climate investments are not taken. Climate impacts could also increase total health costs from $92 million in 2010 to $260 million by 2050." It offered a four-point agenda to help DRC. These are stronger and greener infrastructure and services, more climate-ready education, health systems and social services, more investments in natural capital and better climate governance to leverage carbon markets.

The indication is that every sector needs to be part of the climate ecosystem to help DRC in financing and mitigating climate. UNDP stated that countries need more finance for their climate targets than what they can source domestically. In its report in 2009, high-income countries with a significant historical contribution to climate change had committed to raising US$100 billion every year by 2020 to fund climate action in low-income countries.

The report from UNDP stated that 50 percent of mitigation financing tracked in Africa between 2011- 2021 came from MDBs ($37 billion) and 45 percent from bilateral sources ($33.47 billion). However, the UNDP report also stated that Central Africa has the smallest population of Africa's sub-regions and receives the lowest amount of climate finance. DRC is in Central Africa and faces the challenges of low climate finance.

== Overview ==
It should be recalled that in 2013, the Democratic of Congo was ranked as the poorest country in the world. Perhaps, this affected its climate restoration and deepened the environmental challenge. Thus, it needs support from local and international bodies to mitigate its climate issues. Again, DRC is known to have half of Africa's forests with large freshwater resources, and mineral reserves. All these are critical for a green transition. This puts it in the class of countries that contribute to global climate action. The World Bank stated, "DRC forests can generate an estimated value of $223 billion – 398 billion per year from stored carbon and associated ecosystem services needed to mitigate the impacts of disasters and enhance the resilience of DRC communities. However, if not protected, the loss of 40% of its current extent, could mean that DRC's Land Use, Land-use Change and Forestry (LULUCF) sector becomes a net source of carbon and no longer a sink. The total cost to the world of such a loss in carbon stock—and therefore the capacity of the forests to provide carbon sequestration services—would be about $95.3 billion."

DRC has reasons to protect its country from climate change. According to the Center on International Cooperation, "DRC is home to wetlands, including the largest tropical peatland complex, covering approximately 123,750 kilometers, or 75 percent of the Congo Basin." These need protection from climate change to conserve the natural and cultural spaces of the country to enable economic growth and sustainable development.

== Government finance in the Democratic Republic of Congo ==
In 2015 the government of the Democratic Republic of Congo signed a grant agreement with the Green Climate Fund, which provided the sum of US$300,000 for capacity building in the African State. The Minister of Environment, Nature Conservation, and Sustainable Development of DR Congo was present during the signing of the grant agreement. This fund was meant to build institutional capacity including the technical and operational skills for engagement.

In 2020 the Republic of Congo and The Green Climate Fund (GCF) signed a Privileges and Immunities agreement. It became the 24th country to sign such an agreement with GCF. Its importance lies in effective operation and activities with the investment fund. It should be remembered that the Democratic Republic of Congo was one of the 158 countries including the European Union that signed the Global Methane Pledge with the commitment to reduce the global methane emissions before 2030 in keeping the 1.5°C warming limit within reach.

DRC was part of the 130 countries to sign the Glasgow Leaders' Declaration on Forests and Land Use, to end the forest reverse loss and land degradation by 2030. It also signed a new Forest, Agriculture and Commodity Trade (FACT) Statement, which the UK and Indonesia supported. According to The Leaders' Declaration:

- $12bn in public funding to "support work to protect, restore and sustainably manage forests" from 12 countries, to be delivered over 2021–2025.
- $7.2bn in private investment from corporate and philanthropic funds.
- Of that $19.2bn, at least $1.5bn was earmarked specifically for protecting the forests of Africa's Congo Basin.
- Of that $19.2bn, at least $1.7bn was pledged towards supporting Indigenous peoples and local communities and advancing their land tenure rights.
- A commitment from the chief executives of more than 30 financial institutions to divest from activities linked to commodity-driven deforestation.

In 2022, DRC was one of the countries in the developing sector that contributed to global warming mitigation. Although the developed countries raised 116 billion US dollars to help and support climate change in the developing countries, the report had it that DRC had a deficit in climate funding with the combined donors' opposition to logging and oil exploitation. This caused the National perception to view it as an international conspiracy against the Congolese state, which was seen as a 'victim' of an unequal exchange. However, US$500 million was signed with the Central African Forest Initiative (CAFI) as stated in the second letter.

In June 2025, the DRC received an equivalent of $19.47 million US dollars through the Emission Reduction Program Agreement for reducing 3.89 million tons of carbon emissions through restoring forests in the Mai-Ndombe province. These funds were provided through the World Bank's Forest Carbon Partnership Facility (FCPF), marking the first payment under a broader agreement that could unlock up to $55 million US dollars for reducing 11 million tons of carbon emissions. A significant share of these funds would go to local communities and Indigenous Peoples helping lead forest conservation efforts.

== International financiers ==
In 2015, GCF approved requests of about twenty developing countries that chose UNDP, UNEP or GIZ as partners to carry out its program activities. This was hoped to allow US$5.4 million in grants to the developing countries under GCF. With this, UNDP received its first disbursement for eight countries in which the Republic of Congo was a beneficiary with Bangladesh, Central African Republic, Guinea, India, Liberia, Timor-Leste, and Swaziland under the US$1.35 million.

As of December 31, 2023, data from the Climate Investment Fund (CIF) revealed that it approved three projects for DRC at $28.5m and was expecting co-financing of $96.15m. The co-financing was expected to come from the: Government at $8.56% (8.24M), MBD at 85.65% (82.35M) and the Private sector at 5.79% (5.56M).

USAID supported the Democratic Republic of Congo for improved renewable energy. This was part of the support for climate mitigation. The areas of financing included:

- Establishing two new energy regulatory agencies, which provide essential oversight to the sector.
- Supporting the government to implement a 2014 electricity law by drafting over two dozen decrees, orders, and regulations, of which 14 have already been adopted.
- Providing 1,434 households and 44 businesses access to clean and renewable electricity in Fiscal Year 2020 from a hydropower plant.
- Leveraging over $77 million of funding to provide reliable, affordable energy to the city of Goma.
- Enabling the establishment of 15,612 new grid and off-grid direct connections to date (10,386 in FY 2020).
- Mobilizing a $2.25 million investment for clean energy projects, which will continue to demonstrate the opportunities for off-grid companies in the DRC.

== Paris Agreement ==
The endorsement of the Paris Agreement in 2015 created opportunities to safeguard climate change for Sustainable Development Goals (SDGs), economic growth and improvement of livelihoods. Thus in 2015, The Democratic Republic of the Congo submitted its new climate action plan to the UN Framework Convention on Climate Change (UNFCCC). Part of the agreement was to ensure an average global temperature of 2 degrees Celsius for sustainable development.
