= Climate change in Kenya =

Emissions, impacts and responses of Kenya related to climate change

Köppen climate classification map for Kenya for 1980–2016

2071–2100 map under the most intense climate change scenario. Mid-range scenarios are currently considered more likely.

Climate change is posing an increasing threat to global socioeconomic development and environmental sustainability. Developing countries with low adaptive capacity and high vulnerability to the phenomenon are disproportionately affected. Climate change in Kenya is increasingly impacting the lives of Kenya's citizens and the environment. Climate change has led to more frequent extreme weather events like droughts which last longer than usual, irregular and unpredictable rainfall, flooding and increasing temperatures.

The effects of these climatic changes have made already existing challenges with water security, food security and economic growth even more difficult. Harvests and agricultural production which account for about 33% of total Gross Domestic Product (GDP) are also at risk. The increased temperatures, rainfall variability in arid and semi-arid areas, and strong winds associated with tropical cyclones have combined to create favourable conditions for the breeding and migration of pests. An increase in temperature of up to 2.5 °C by 2050 is predicted to increase the frequency of extreme events such as floods and droughts.

Hot and dry conditions in Arid and Semi-Arid Lands (ASALs) make droughts or flooding brought on by extreme weather changes even more dangerous. Coastal communities are already experiencing sea level rise and associated challenges such as saltwater intrusion. Lake Victoria, Lake Turkana and other lakes have significantly increased in size between 2010 and 2020 flooding lakeside communities., wo

The annual fossil fuel carbon dioxide emissions, in million metric tons of carbon, for a variety of non-overlapping regions covering the Earth

== Greenhouse gas emissions ==
Kenya's annual greenhouse gas emissions are low at less than 1 tonne per person, totalling less than 100 million tonnes of CO_{2}eq a year, of which almost a third is from deforestation. In 2020 Kenya submitted a Forest Reference Level to the UNFCCC. In terms of global context, Kenya accounted for just 0.1% of CO_{2} emissions from combustible fuels in 2021.

CO2 emissions per capita (2012-2021)
Year	tCO2 / Capit
2012	0.244
2013	0.265
2014	0.301
2015	0.319
2016	0.333
2017	0.347
2018	0.325
2019	0.324
2020	0.303
2021	0.329

Half of Kenya's electricity is produced through hydropower; because the generation and distribution of electricity is unreliable, some manufacturing firms generate supplemental power with fossil fuel sources. Droughts and increasing evaporation also decreased hydropower capacity, which will in turn increase the use of more polluting energy sources.

Human activities increases the strength of greenhouse effect which contributes to climate change. Most likely is carbon dioxide from burning fossil fuels: coal, oil, and natural gas.

== Impact on the natural environment ==
=== Temperature and weather changes ===
Temperature anomalies were positive every year since 2000 with respect to the climatological mean of the years 1981 to 2010 according to satellite data. Analysis of climate trends in Kenya's Arid and Semi Arid (ASAL) areas shows an increase in temperature and a decrease in rainfall between 1977 and 2014. Climate change impacts are predicted to be particularly pronounced in ASALs where the economy and rural livelihoods are highly dependent on climate-sensitive activities, such as pastoralism and rainfed cultivation.

Increased temperatures, rainfall variability and strong winds associated with tropical cyclones have combined to create favourable conditions for the breeding of insects and pests. For instance, in early 2020 some parts of Kenya and neighbouring East African Countries faced massive swarms of locusts. Even if directly attributing specific infestations to climate change is difficult, climate change is known to be capable of changing the feeding and outbreak dynamics of some insect species.

Recent weather patterns in Kenya have deviated from the norm, with unusually severe rains from March to May this year, influenced by the El Niño phenomenon which highlights the increased variability and severity of weather events.

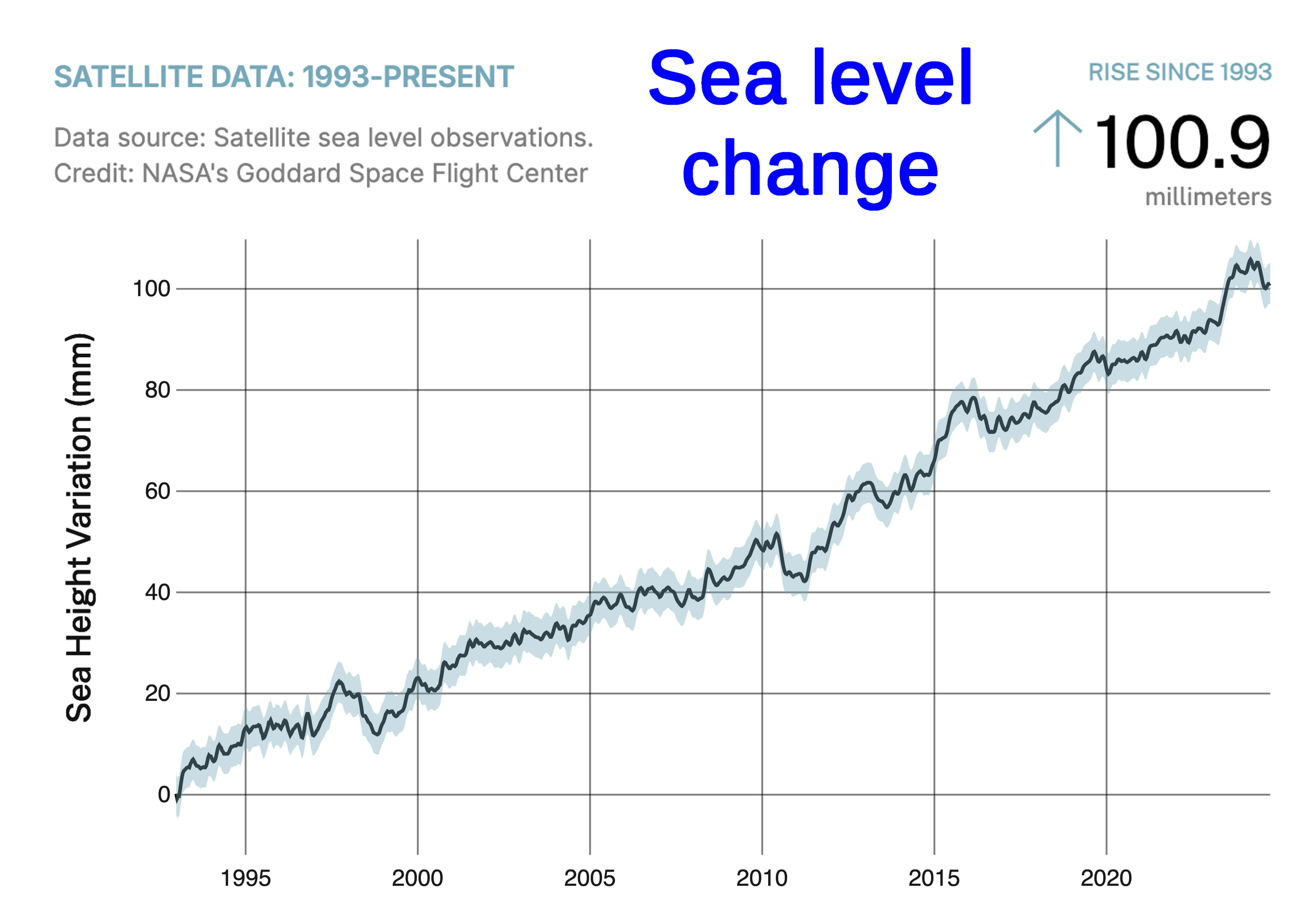
NASA-Satellite-sea-level-rise-observations

=== Sea level rise ===
Currently, the annual rise of sea level is approximately 3mm every year. Regional variations exist due to natural variability in regional winds and ocean currents, which can take place over periods of days, months or even decades.

Global coastal areas face challenges as a result of anthropogenic sea-level rise. Rising mean sea levels (MSL) and storm surges combine to exacerbate extreme sea levels (ESL). Increasing ESL is a significant challenge for nearly 2.6 billion people in the Indian Ocean region to adapt to climate change. Around 17% – 4,600 hectares (11,000 acres) – of Mombasa would be threatened by a sea level rise of 30 centimetres (12 in).

Rising sea levels will likely lead to destruction of infrastructure including ship docking ports and industries located within the coast region if no adaptation strategies are implemented. It can also lead to even increased acute water supply and salinization problems, as freshwater aquifers are contaminated.

=== Impact on water resources ===
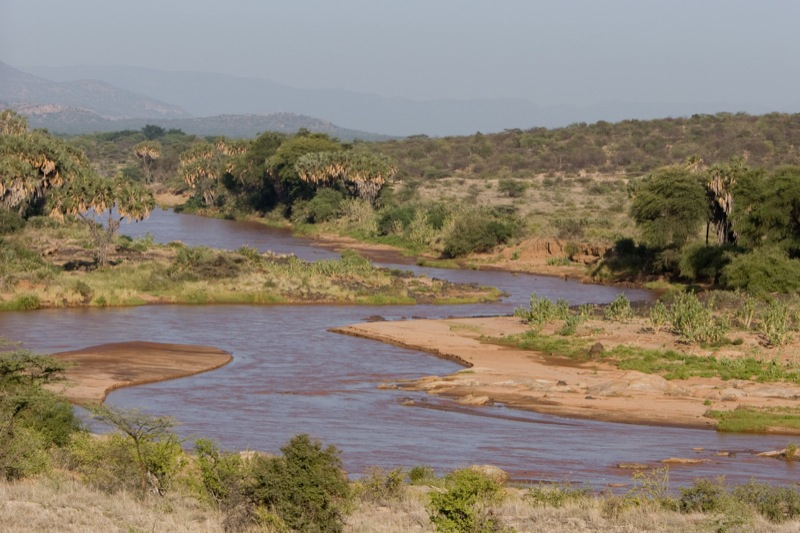
River Shaba in Shaba National Reserve – one of the water resources that will be affected by climate change in Kenya

The replenishment of groundwater reservoirs, a major source of drinking water in Africa, is being threatened by a reduction in precipitation. Rainfall levels between March and May/June decreased in Eastern Africa from at least the 1980s onwards, and monsoon rain decreased between 1948 and 2009 in the Horn of Africa. The annual flow of water from rivers passing through East Africa, such as the Nile, will decrease as a result of climate change. Increasing drought and desertification is expected to cause an increased scarcity of freshwater. While international standards suggest that 1,000 m^{3} of water should be available per person, only 586 m^{3} was available in 2010, and this may fall to 293 m^{3} by 2050. The shrinking of Mount Kenya's glaciers has exacerbated water shortages. Due to glacial run-off, rivers that once flowed year round now flow seasonally, aggravating conflicts over water resources.

=== Ecosystems ===
Climate change may significantly disrupt the ecosystem services involved in agriculture, such as by affecting species distribution, inter-species relationships, and altering the effectiveness of management regimes. Such services are also needed by the $2.5 billion tourism sector. Kenya's wildlife species are expected to be affected in a variety of ways as the climate changes, with changes in temperature and rainfall affecting seasonal events and species ranges.

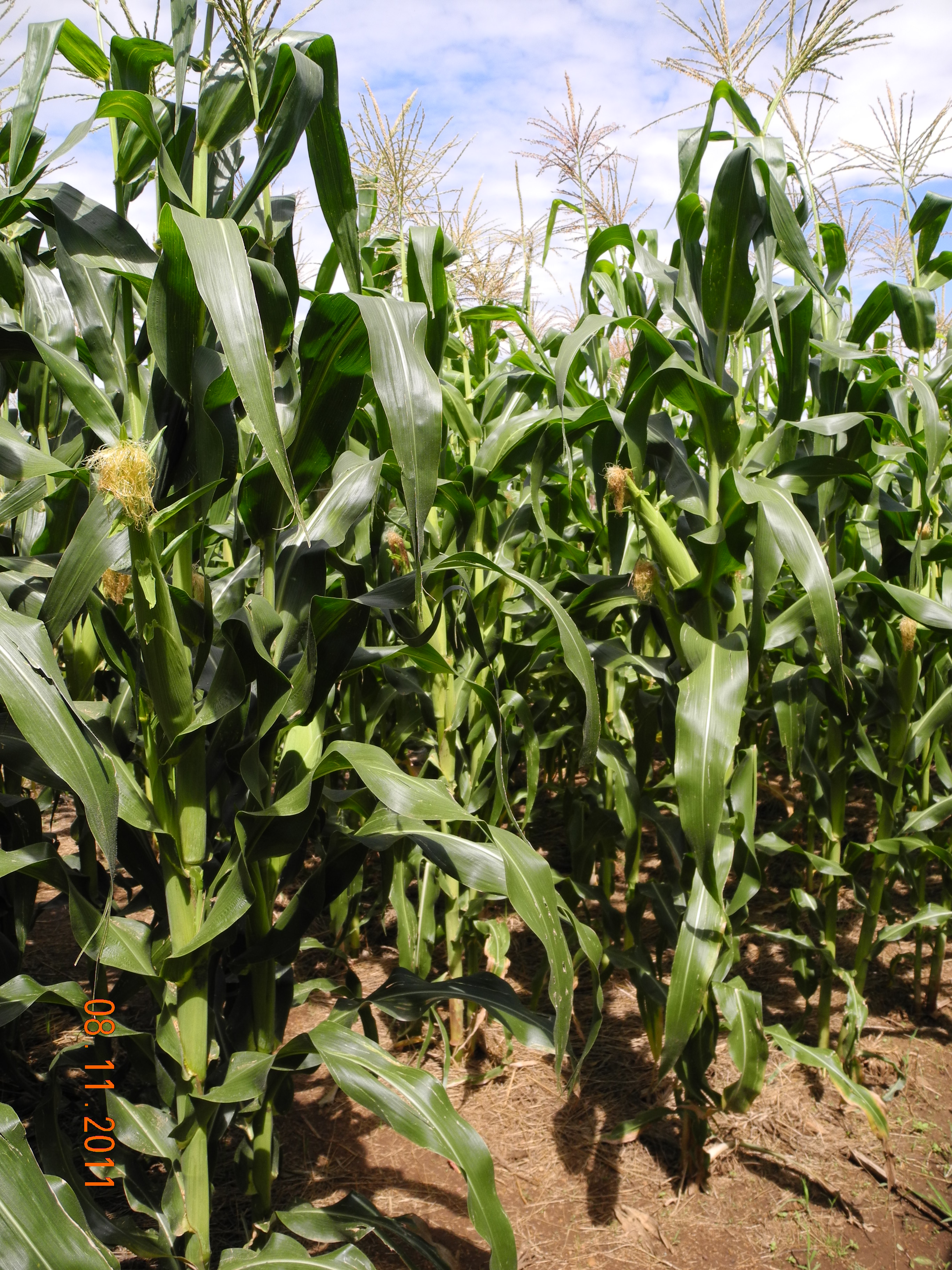
Maize Plantation in Kenya

Forest cover 7.4 percent of Kenya's land, and provide services including improving water quality, preventing erosion, and absorbing greenhouse gases, in addition to being habitats for other wildlife. According to the UN Food and Agriculture Organization (FAO), forest cover in Kenya declined sharply from 12% in 1990 to 6% in 2010, before recovering slightly to 9% by 2022, as reported by the Kenya Forest Service.

Historically, from 1990 to 2015, the forest cover decreased by 25% (824,115 hectares), averaging a loss of 33,000 hectares per year. More recently, this rate has decreased to about 5,000 hectares lost annually.

This reduces both the ecosystem services the forests provide, including by diminishing wood yield and quality, and the biodiversity they support. Climate change may impede the recovery of these forests. It adversely affects forest regenerative capacity, limiting tree growth and survival, as well as increasing pest and pathogen range. There is also an increased risk and severity of forest fires as temperatures increase and droughts increase in length. Other affected habitats are coral reefs and mangroves, whose ecosystem services include protection from storm surges, providing opportunities for eco-tourism, and sustaining fisheries which are directly affected by increasing temperatures and rising sea levels.

== Impact on people ==
=== Economic impacts ===
The two most important sectors of the Kenyan economy are agriculture and tourism, both of which are highly vulnerable to effects of climate change. A drought lasting from 2008 to 2011 caused an estimated $12.1 billion in damage. Food insecurity caused droughts from 2014 to 2022 which affected approximately 3.4 million people while in 2018, about 500,000 people lost access to water.

With a population of 48.5 million people, Kenya is the largest economy in East and Central Africa, and serves as a diplomatic, communications, financial and trade hub within the region. Economic damage caused by climate variability and extreme weather may equate to 2.6% of GDP by 2030.

==== Agriculture and livestock ====
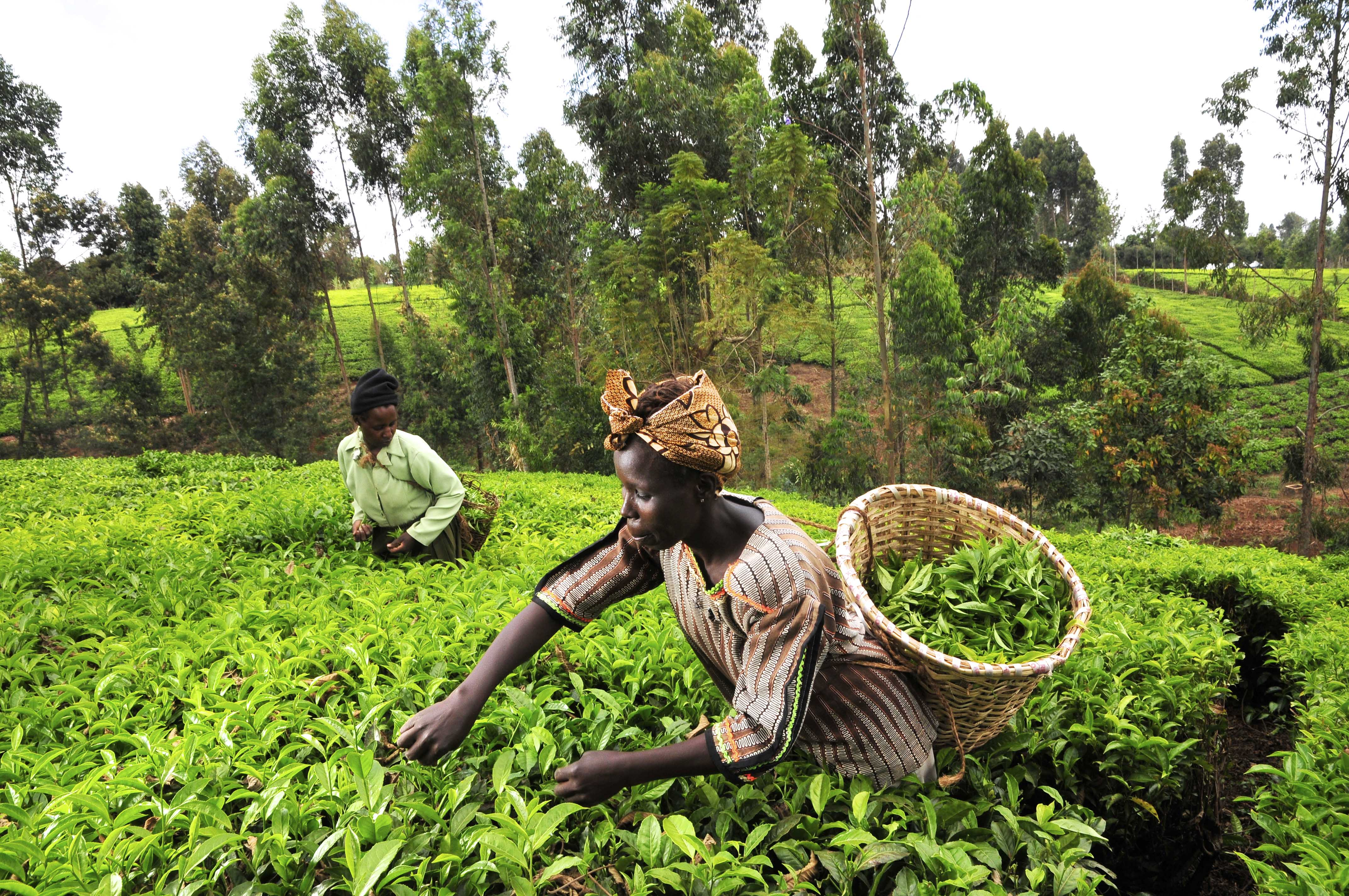
Tea pickers in Kenya's Mount Kenya region, for the Two Degrees Up project, to look at the impact of climate change on agriculture

Agriculture remains an important component of Kenyan households' economic and social well-being. Climate change is already affecting the country's agricultural sector, which is responsible for over 33 percent of Kenya's GDP and is the primary source of sustenance for 60% of the population. Three quarters of Kenya's farming produce comes from small scale farmers. In some areas of Kenya temperatures can exceed 35 °C (95 °F), at which the heat is damaging to maize, a staple crop in Kenya.

Kenya is one of the world's largest producers of tea, with the sector accounting for about a quarter of total export earnings and 4% of GDP. The industry provides rural jobs that are key to the reduction of rural–urban migration, but the areas currently used to cultivate tea are expected to face increasing climate driven stresses.

High temperatures are also expected to increase pest and disease loads in domesticated animals, especially in arid and semi-arid (ASALs) regions. Livestock trends in ASALs between 1977 and 2016 show cattle declined by 26.5%, while sheep and goats increase by 76% and camels by 13.3%. Climate change could result in the loss of 52% of the ASAL cattle population (or 1.7 million cattle) at a cost of US$340–680 million to the economy.

A number of startups, non profits and companies are working to address climate change–related issues.

==== Manufacturing sector ====
Kenya's manufacturing sector, which produces good for both domestic use and exports, is one of the largest in Sub-Saharan Africa, accounting for almost 10% of GDP in 2010, and employing 13% of formal sector labour in 2012, its output was valued at over KES1 trillion in 2014. Consuming around 60% of electricity generated in the country, manufacturing produces about 10% of Kenya's greenhouse gas emissions.

Kenya's National Climate Change Action Plan (NCCAP) identifies some impacts of climate change on the manufacturing sector:

- Energy fluctuations or blackouts due to interruptions of energy supply arising from lower annual rainfall and severe droughts which causes the water level in the hydroelectric power plants to decline, resulting to low power production.
- Greater resource scarcity such as water and raw materials due to climate variations and increasing scarcity of water
- Greater risk of plant, product and infrastructure damage and supply chain disruptions from extreme weather conditions such as heat wave, wind etc flood, droughts, cyclones and storms
- Higher costs of production due to unstable supply of electricity, and higher insurance premiums

=== Health impacts ===
Different effects caused or exacerbated by climate change, such as heat, drought, and floods, negatively affect human health. The risk of vector and water borne diseases will rise. 83 million people are expected to be at risk of malaria alone by 2070, a disease which is already responsible for 5% of deaths in children under the age of five and causes large expense. Dengue fever is similarly expected to increase by 2070.

Among people aged 65 and over, heat stress-related mortality is expected to increase from 2 deaths per 100,000 per year in 1990 to 45 per 100,000 by 2080. Under a low-emissions scenario, this may be limited to just 7 deaths per 100,000 in 2080. Under a high emission scenario, climate change is expected to exacerbate diarrhea deaths, causing around 9% of such deaths for children under 15 by 2030, and 13% of such deaths by 2050. Malnutrition may rise by up to 20% by 2050. In 2009, it was recorded in Kenya that the prevalence of stunting in children, underweight children and wasting in children under age 5 was 35.2%, 16.4% and 7.0%, respectively.

== Mitigation and adaptation ==
=== Policies and legislation ===
The National Environmental Management Authority in the Ministry of Environment, Climate Change and Forestry (MECCF), the National Climate Change Activities Coordinating Committee, and the Kenya Meteorological Department in the Ministry of Transport are the major components of the government's institutional framework tasked with the day to day building of climate resilience.

In 2010 the Kenyan government published the National Climate Change Response Strategy. The Climate Change Act 2016 establishes a National Climate Change Council, which is chaired by Kenya's president, with the authority to oversee "the development, management, implementation and regulation of mechanisms to enhance climate change resilience and low carbon development for the sustainable development of Kenya", by the National and County Governments, the private sector, civil society, and others.

The National Adaptation Plan (NAP) was implemented in 2015 to improve climate resilience. The NAP contains the Adaptation Technical Analysis Report (ATAR), which examines sectoral economic vulnerabilities, identifies adaptation needs, and suggests potential adaptation actions in different counties. The NAP supports the development of local County Integrated Development Plans (CIPDs), which includes the establishment of County Climate Change Funds (CCCFs).

The current National Climate Change Action Plan (NCCAP 2018–2022) follows the National Climate Change Action Plan 2013–2017. The plan focuses on adaptation and mitigation measures the country can take, with the aim of "low carbon climate resilient development". The National Environment Management Authority serves as the country's accredited body to international climate financing organizations such as The Adaptation Fund and the Green Climate Fund.

In 2022 President Ruto said: "Wind turbines and solar panels are quick to construct and can generate and deliver power far more quickly and easily than a new oil rig, and with much less harm to our fragile climate."

== Society and culture ==
In urban areas, increasing population and informal settlement size is exposing more people to heat, flooding, and water scarcity. The consequences of climate change have impacted marginalized communities, women and the youth.

The Arid and Semi Arid areas host 38% of the population, and produce 12% of GDP. Poverty rates in northern ASALs remains above 80%, despite overall decreasing national poverty rates.

== See also ==
- Climate change adaptation
- Climate change in Africa
- National Tree Growing Day
- Kenya Forest Service
