= Climate finance in Mexico =

Financial allocations to climate change mitigation in Mexico

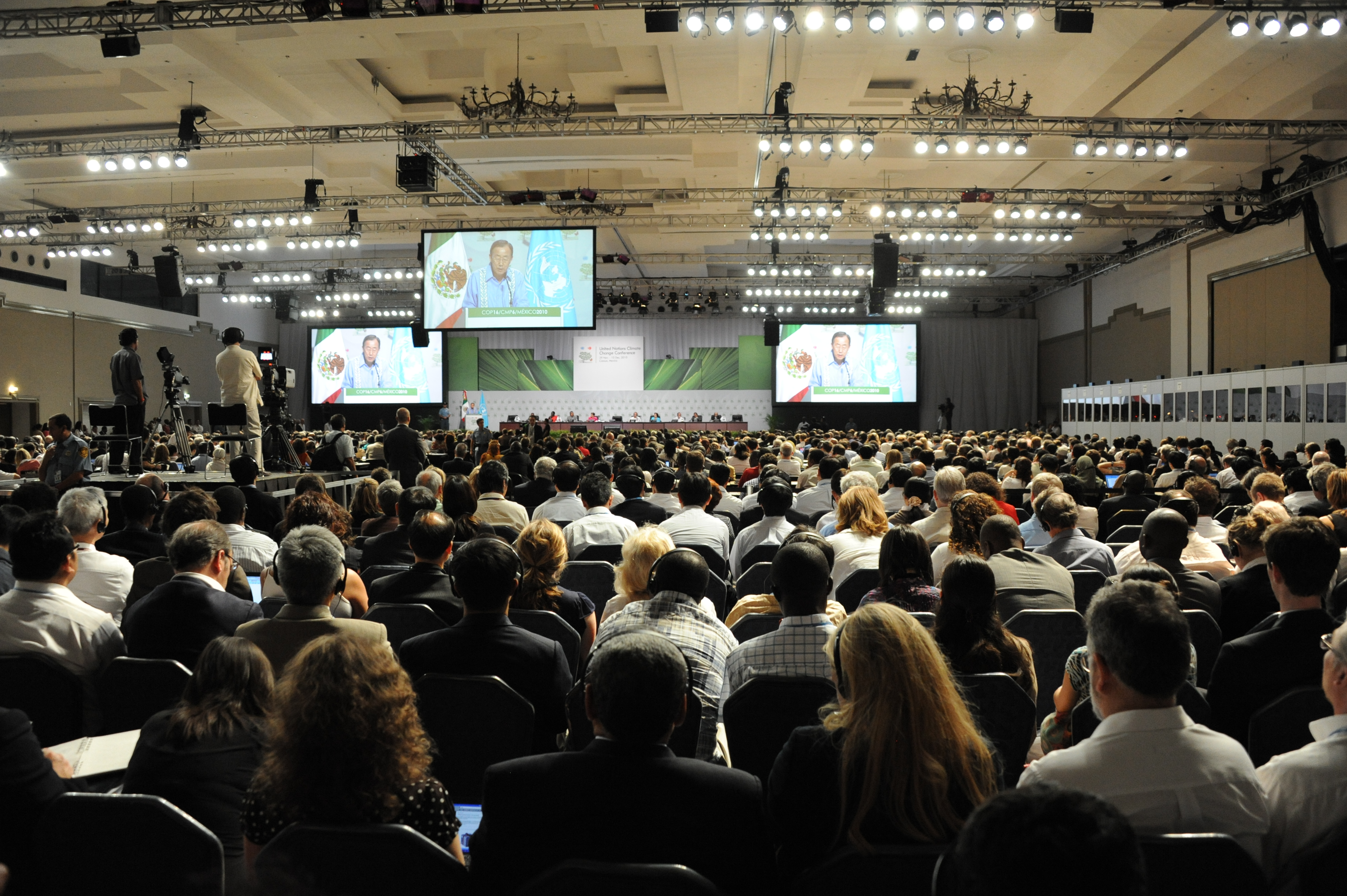
Ban Ki-moon, then Secretary-General of the United Nations, speaks during the 2010 United Nations Climate Change Conference in Cancún, Mexico

Climate finance in Mexico integrates public, private, and multilateral resources to support initiatives to reduce emissions and adapt to the impacts of climate change, fulfilling national and international commitments under the United Nations Framework Convention on Climate Change (UNFCCC) and the Paris Agreement.

This complex system involves legal frameworks, channeling and monitoring mechanisms—notably Measurement, Reporting and Verification (MRV) methodologies—and is operationalized by Mexican institutions such as the Secretariat of Environment and Natural Resources (SEMARNAT), the Secretariat of Finance and Public Credit (SHCP), the National Financiera (NAFIN), and the National Bank for Public Works and Services (Banobras), as well as by multilateral organizations such as the Green Climate Fund (GCF) and the Global Environment Facility (GEF).

However, despite advances in thematic instruments (green, social and sustainable bonds), national projects and international partnerships, a significant financing gap remains, with institutional challenges but also prospects for expanding the sustainable market.

== Definition ==
There is no definitive consensus on the definition of climate finance, but the term is widely used to designate financial resources mobilized by public and private actors, at the global and local levels, to support climate change mitigation and adaptation activities. According to the UNFCCC, climate finance should be characterized by the nature of the activities financed—rather than by the providers, intermediaries, or financial instruments—focusing on adaptation and mitigation results. The COP (United Nations Climate Change Conference) 15 in Copenhagen, in December 2009, established the political commitment to mobilize US$100 billion annually by 2020 for climate action in developing countries, enshrining the target in subsequent agreements. At COP16 in Cancun in November 2010, it was decided to create the GCF as a multilateral fund to provide long-term financing for mitigation and adaptation projects, formalized in 2010 and operationalized from 2015.

== Mexican context ==
=== Climate vulnerabilities ===
Map of Mexico by Köppen-Geiger climate classification (1980–2016)

Map of Mexico for the period 2071-2100 under the most intense climate change scenario. Medium-range scenarios are currently considered more likely.

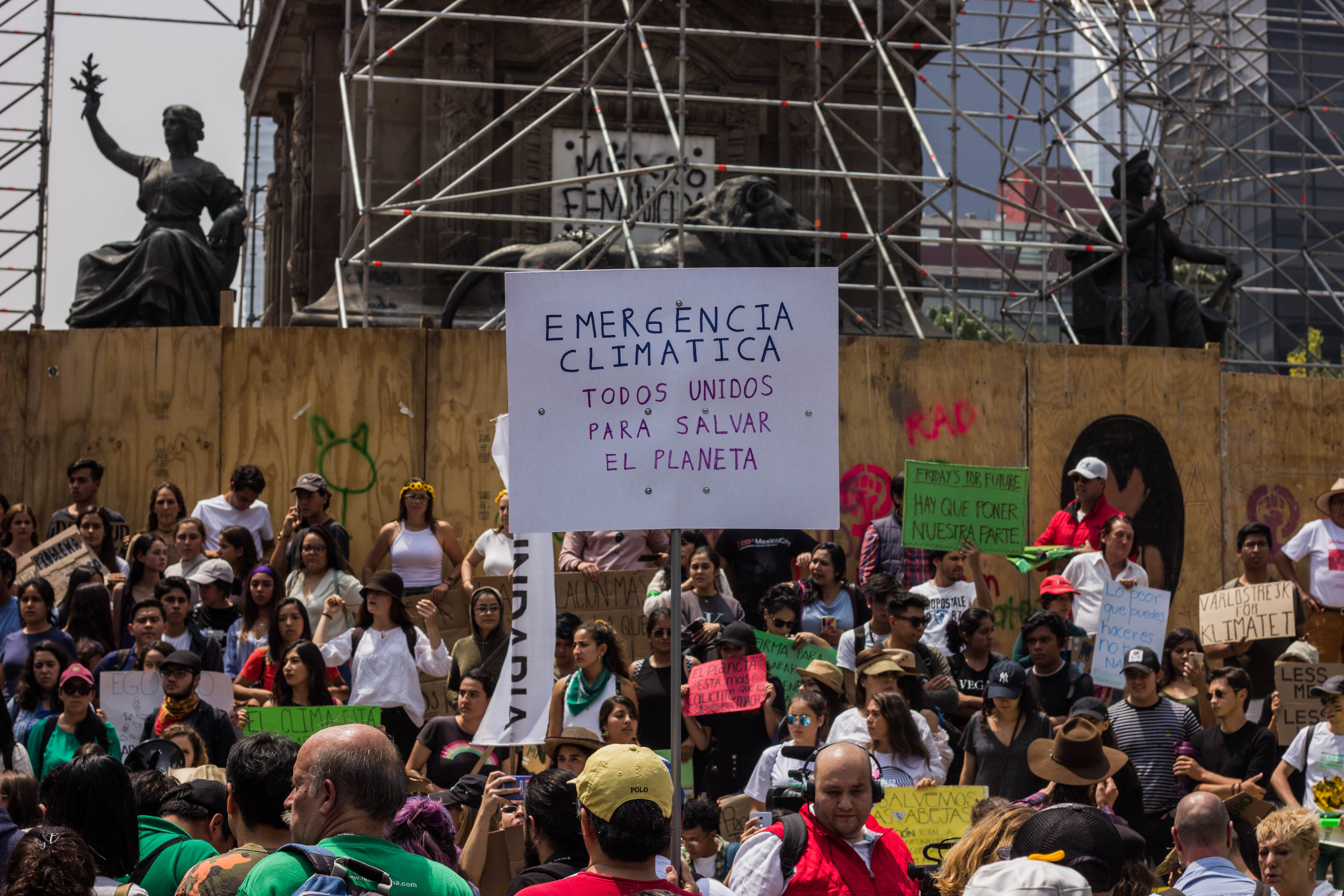
Protesters demonstrate in Mexico City during the September 2019 Climate Strike

Mexico has seen an increase in average annual temperature of approximately 0.9 °C between 1950 and 2020, coupled with irregular variations in precipitation, which intensifies extreme events such as prolonged droughts and flash floods in different regions of the country. In 2024, the country faced its third heat wave of the year, with temperatures exceeding 45 °C in 19 states and more than 70% of the territory in a moderate to severe drought situation, causing at least 61 deaths directly attributed to extreme heat. According to the Notre Dame Global Adaptation Index (ND-GAIN), which measures exposure, sensitivity, and adaptive capacity, Mexico obtained a vulnerability score of 0.368 in 2021, placing it among the countries with "medium-high vulnerability" and indicating significant social and economic adaptation challenges.

The National Atlas of Vulnerability to Climate Change (ANVCC) of Mexico's National Institute of Ecology and Climate Change (INECC) has mapped, at municipal level, risks such as water stress, landslides, and floods, identifying more than 1,200 municipalities with high or very high territorial vulnerability, especially in the north-central and mountainous regions of the country. According to the G20 Climate Risk Atlas, Mexico faces simultaneous threats from heat waves, wildfires, floods, and tropical cyclones, creating a multifaceted risk landscape that demands integrated responses.

In coastal areas, recent modeling predicts that parts of the northwestern mangroves and Atlantic sandflats will be at risk of permanent submersion under moderate sea-level rise scenarios, compromising protective ecosystems and local livelihoods. The town of El Bosque, on the Campeche coast, illustrates this process: accelerated sea rise and recurring storms have reduced its population from 700 to fewer than 12 residents in less than a decade, highlighting the rapid exposure of coastal communities to sea-level rise and erosion. Finally, the 2025 Atlantic hurricane season reinforces Mexico's heightened exposure to high-intensity tropical storms, particularly in states such as Guerrero, Oaxaca, and Quintana Roo.

Mexico faces a significant deforestation challenge, driven primarily by expanding agricultural facilities and growing urban sprawl across the country. Mexico has one of the highest deforestation rates in the world, with 1,380,000 hectares of forest lost annually. The Mexican government implemented the $3.4 million "Sembrando Vida" program in 2018, which strives to combat rural poverty and environmental degradation through reforestation. More than 400,000 people have been hired to support reforestation efforts in 24 states. However, critics report that participants are clearing jungle to plant trees, rather than preserving and expanding existing forests. In 2016 Mexico devised and published a national strategy to take action on the topic of its Biodiversity by 2030, this plan is to understand, conserve, and restore it. | url= https://www.mdpi.com/1424-2818/17/3/185 A drastic change in water patterns has affected Mexico's agricultural sector, with prolonged droughts and limited access to water resources. This has forced farmers to rely on irrigation to maintain production or switch to crops that require less water. In 2024, Mexico faced a three-year drought that caused agricultural concerns and water scarcity issues, with an estimated 20% to 40% reduction in corn production due to the prolonged drought. Regarding agricultural policy, President Sheinbaum announced a plan to guarantee prices for farmers for national staples—corn, beans, and coffee—with the goal of achieving "food sovereignty" by October 2024.

=== History of climate finance ===
Mexico took its first formal steps in climate finance with the creation of the Special Climate Change Program (PECC) 2009–2012, published in the Official Gazette of the Federation on August 28, 2009, aiming to integrate mitigation and adaptation policy without compromising economic development. Through the PECC 2009–2012, the federal government established four strategic components—Long-Term Vision, Mitigation, Adaptation, and Institutional Strengthening—to consolidate a comprehensive climate policy.

In 2012, with the enactment of the General Climate Change Law (LGCC), Article 80 established the Climate Change Fund Trust, structured as a public trust administered by the Secretariat of Finance and Public Credit (SHCP), with the objective of raising and channeling financial resources to support climate projects. According to operational rules from November 2018, this trust was established on November 30, 2012, formalized by contract on the same day, under the presidency of SHCP as sole trustee and with the participation of SEMARNAT and NAFIN as technical fiduciaries.

In 2015, NAFIN issued the first green bond in US dollars worth US$500 million, marking Mexico's debut in international climate debt markets. The following year, NAFIN launched its first green bond denominated in Mexican pesos, consolidating the framework for national thematic climate finance. These national milestones laid the foundation for multilateral cooperation, as noted in the UNFCCC framework report, which highlights contributions from seven partner countries and four international organizations— the World Bank, the IDB, the Clean Technology Fund, and the GEF—to climate projects in Mexico.

=== Legal frameworks ===
The Federal Budget and Fiscal Responsibility Law (LFPRH), in force since 2006, regulates the incorporation of financing revenues into the Revenue Law and establishes transparency and accountability criteria for the use of public resources, including those earmarked for climate change.

The General Climate Change Law (LGCC), enacted on May 28, 2012, establishes the basis for Mexico to contribute to compliance with the Paris Agreement and regulates principles, objectives, and strategies for mitigating and adapting to climate change at the federal, state, and municipal levels. Article 2 defines the objectives of promoting "mitigation of greenhouse gases and adaptation of Mexican society" and guarantees the right to a "healthy environment for current and future generations."

The Energy Transition Law (LTE), published on December 24, 2015, sets objectives for the diversification of the energy matrix, promotes the sustainable use of energy, and imposes obligations to purchase clean energy on suppliers, establishing specific funds for energy efficiency and distributed generation projects.

=== Energy panorama ===
==== Energy matrix ====
Energy sources in Mexico
1. Coal 4.7 (4.52%)
2. Natural Gas 41.3 (39.7%)
3. Hydroelectricity 4 (3.85%)
4. Biofuel 4.7 (4.52%)
5. Crude oil 42.6 (41.0%)
6. Others 6.7 (6.44%)

In October 2024, Mexican President Claudia Sheinbaum championed the expansion of renewable energy in the country and unveiled a plan to increase the share of renewable energy in the country's energy mix to 45% by 2030. In March 2025, Sheinbaum approved a series of laws known as the "Energy Reform," which aims to add about 23 gigawatts of additional capacity by 2030, along with 100 transmission and distribution projects. While the reform focuses on strengthening state-owned energy companies, it also reserves 46% of the electricity on the grid to be generated by private companies.

Mexico 's abundant natural resources present potential for wind and solar energy projects off the coast. Innovation in the fields of climate technology and finance has led to the development of the venture capital market and a rise in startups focused on renewable energy. The largest sources of total energy supply are crude oil (42.6%) and natural gas (41.3%). Other sources include coal (4.7%) and biofuel (4.7%). Net energy imports totaled 13.9% in 2023, growing significantly since 2000. The United States is Mexico's largest energy importer due to strong pipeline connections.

Total electricity production in the country in 2023 was 356,416 GWh. The largest electricity consumption comes from industry (59%), the residential sector (23.7%), and the commercial and utilities sector (6.7%). Electricity demand growth has slowed in recent years due to improvements in energy efficiency and a shift to less energy-intensive sectors. Mexico's per capita electricity consumption was 0.0024 GWh in 2023. In 2023, electricity prices in the country averaged approximately $0.15 per GWh, a value that has fluctuated over the last 5 years between $0.11 per GWh in 2017 and $0.15 per GWh in 2023.

The largest source of energy for electricity is natural gas, imports of which from the United States have increased by 400%, from 0.5 trillion cubic feet to 2.0 trillion cubic feet since 2011. The government's goal is for renewable energy to constitute 45% of electricity production by 2030, a significant increase from 23% in 2023.

Mexico's National Electric System (SEN) is one of the largest in the Western Hemisphere, consisting of nine regions and a binational system in Baja California, with most regions interconnected as part of the National Interconnected System (SIN). The total installed capacity of Mexico's electricity grid reached 87,130 MW in 2022, marking a 1.3% increase over 2021, with a broader capacity of 92,503 MW when including interconnected plants and distributed generation. The grid includes both public and private generating plants. In 2022, 30% of the grid's electricity was generated by the private sector.

On March 7, 2025, new regulations established a framework for energy storage in Mexico, defining its role in stabilizing the grid, supporting renewable energy, and increasing industrial energy security. According to PRODESEN 2024–2038, Mexico will need 8.4 GW of energy storage capacity by 2038 to ensure grid stability and facilitate the integration of renewable energy, which will require strategic incentives, market access, and solid financing.

==== Renewable energies ====
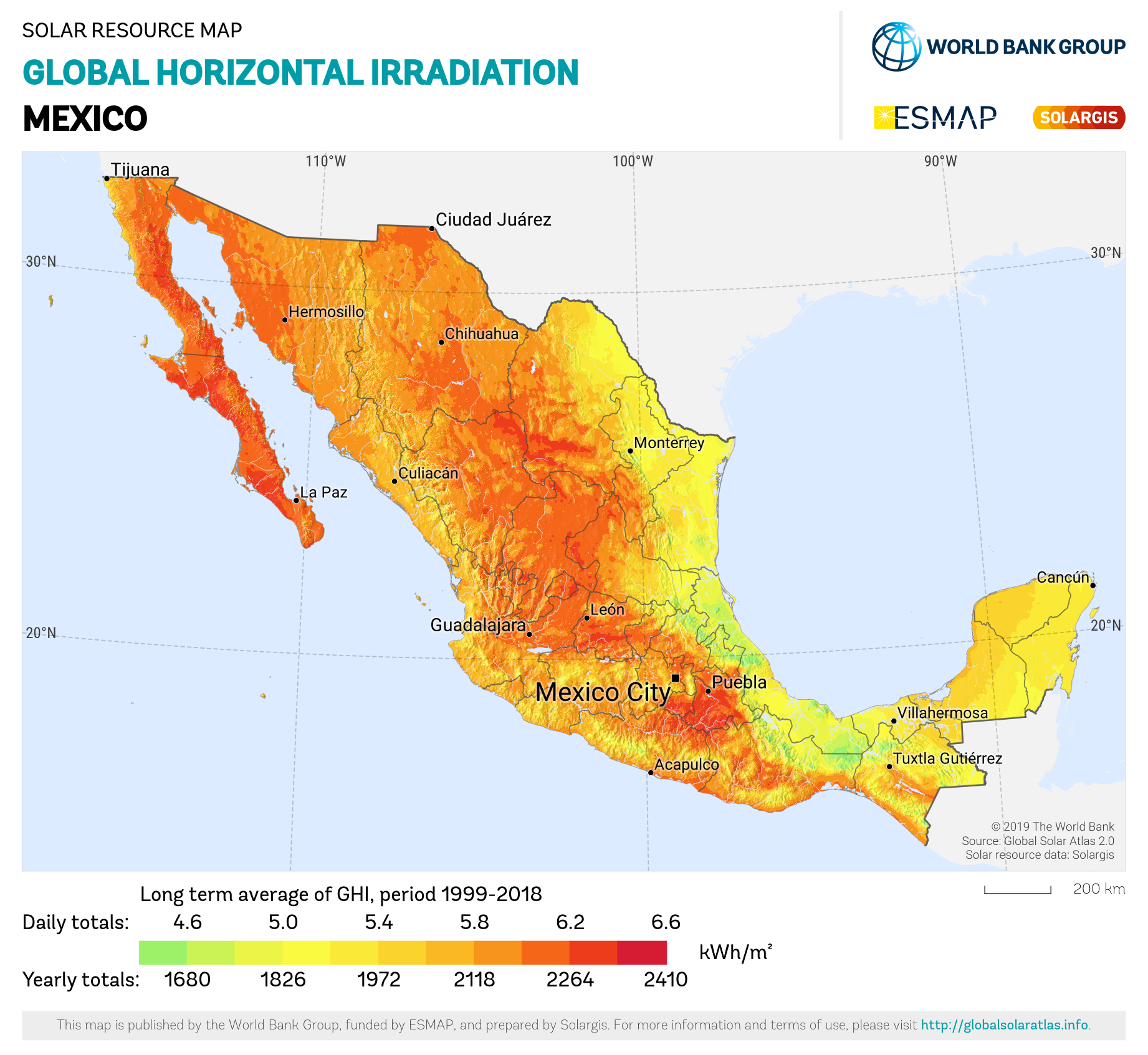
Map of Mexican territory by solar radiation index

In 2012, Mexico passed the “General Law on Climate Change,” which calls for at least 35% of electricity generation to come from clean energy sources by 2024, with a 50% reduction in emissions (compared to 2000) by 2050. In October 2024, the Mexican government announced a new plan to increase renewable energy to 45% of the energy mix by 2030, focusing on solar photovoltaic technology to reduce energy costs in hot regions. This includes limiting crude oil production to 1.8 mb/d, strengthening refineries, and boosting petrochemical and fertilizer production. The plan will require a $23.4 billion investment from the Mexican government and $9 billion in private investment.

Mexico has some of the highest levels of solar irradiation in the world, particularly in Sonora, Chihuahua, and Baja California . Average solar radiation is 5.5 kWh/m^{2} per day, significantly higher than many leading solar energy countries.

The Isthmus of Tehuantepec in Oaxaca is one of the best wind corridors in the world, with wind speeds exceeding 10 meters per second. Other hotspots for wind power include Yucatán, Tamaulipas, and Baja California. Mexico already has large-scale wind farms, and there is potential for the expansion of offshore wind power.

Mexico has one of the largest geothermal energy potentials in the world, due to the interaction of tectonic plates and volcanic activity throughout the country. Experts project a geothermal potential of up to 200 GW, which could meet 17% of the country's energy needs.

=== Financial overview ===
Mexico's retail banking market size is estimated at US$26.23 billion in 2025 and is expected to reach US$32.81 billion by 2029, with a CAGR of 5.76% during the forecast period (2025–2029). There are 51 banks and 65 credit unions registered in Mexico, and 50% of the Mexican population is unbanked, as of 2021. This is significantly lower than other Latin American countries with large economies, such as Brazil and Colombia. There are 650 fintech startups in Mexico, making it one of the largest fintech markets in Latin America.

The two main stock exchanges are the Bolsa Mexicana de Valores (BMV) and the Bolsa Institucional de Valores (BIVA). The renewable energy market in Mexico is expected to register a compound annual growth rate (CAGR) of over 10% over the forecast period to 2030, starting in 2024, when the Mexican renewable energy market was valued at $7.4 billion, but projections estimate the market will grow to $16.6 billion by 2031.

==== Foreign investment ====
The mission of the Federal Electricity Commission (CFE) is to ensure energy justice for the population and promote sustainable development in the electricity sector. The CFE is now recognized as a state-owned public company, different from its previous designation as a "productive state company." The National Energy Control Center (CENACE) operates the national electricity grid, manages the wholesale electricity market, and oversees grid upgrades for interconnection. Mexico's public-private partnerships in the energy sector require that at least 54% of the national grid's electricity come from the CFE, leaving up to 46% for private sector producers.

The 2013 energy reform spurred investment in the Mexican energy market. From 2012 to 2021, Mexico's electricity market attracted over $15 billion in foreign investment. Notably, 64% of this investment occurred between 2015 and 2018, following the passage of the 2013 Energy Reform and the implementation of its laws in 2014. Long-term auctions secured low-cost power purchase agreements (PPAs), attracting international investors such as Enel, Acciona, and Iberdrola. The government, however, canceled the auctions, leading to investment uncertainty in 2019. Under President Andrés Manuel López Obrador, there was a shift toward state control of energy, favoring CFE and PEMEX over private renewables. These policies sought to prioritize CFE over private renewables in the dispatch order, leading to legal disputes and investor skepticism. As a result, foreign direct investment (FDI) in renewables fell significantly, with investors reallocating funds to markets with clearer regulatory frameworks.

==== Sustainable investments ====
ESG-labeled bond issuance has grown in Mexico. By 2023, more than 45% of all local bond issuances had the label.

- Government-issued bonds: The Mexican government issued the first sovereign bond linked to the United Nations Sustainable Development Goals (SDGs) in Latin America in 2020, aligning debt financing.
- Corporate green bonds: Companies such as Fibra Uno, BBVA México, and Grupo Bimbo have issued green and sustainability-linked bonds to finance projects related to renewable energy, water conservation, and circular economy initiatives.
- Development bank bonds: Institutions such as NAFIN (Nacional Financiera) and Banobras have issued green and social bonds to finance low-carbon infrastructure, energy efficiency, and affordable housing.
- Sustainability-linked bonds (SLBs): Unlike green bonds, SLBs link financial conditions to ESG performance targets.

== Sources of financing ==
=== Public ===
The Climate Change Trust Fund raises public and private, national and international resources, allocating environmental grants and credit lines. The Green Climate Fund (GCF) provides concessional financing through agreements with the Inter-American Development Bank (IDB), supporting energy efficiency and coastal resilience projects in the country. The Global Environment Facility (GEF) allocates resources targeted at biodiversity, climate, and sustainable land use, strengthening conservation and adaptation initiatives. In 2021, the National Bank of Public Works and Services (Banobras) established its Sustainability Framework, integrating ESG policies to finance transportation, water, and energy projects with a focus on social and environmental sustainability. By the end of 2021, Banobras's direct credit portfolio for sustainable projects represented a significant portion of its institutional activity promoting green infrastructure.

=== Private ===
Nacional Financiera (NAFIN) consolidated its private equity holdings by issuing the first green bond in dollars (US$500 million) in 2015 and the first green bond in Mexican pesos in 2016, paving the way for subsequent corporate issuances. BBVA México was recognized with the "Green Bond Pioneer Awards" for issuing Mexico's first corporate finance green bond, worth 3.5 billion pesos, aimed at financing sustainable projects such as green buildings and renewable energy. In March 2024, Banorte issued three series of sustainable bonds in the local market totaling approximately US$785 million, with ratings of 'AAA.mx' by Moody's and 'AAA (mex)' by Fitch Ratings. According to the Climate Bonds Initiative's "Mexico Sustainable Debt State of the Market Report 2023," green, social, and sustainable (GSS+) bond issuance in the country reached $55.7 billion through December 2023, indicating strong dynamism in the voluntary market. Private equity and microfinance funds have also launched thematic instruments for micro and small businesses, although the volume of these mechanisms is still in its infancy compared to that of large issuers. Furthermore, parametric insurance solutions, developed in a tripartite project by the Insurance Development Forum (IDF), the United Nations Development Programme (UNDP), and the German government, have covered more than 10,000 smallholder farmers against extreme events, an example of public-private partnerships in climate adaptation.

== Channeling and monitoring mechanisms ==
The Measurement, Reporting and Verification (MRV) system for climate finance in Mexico is designed to ensure transparency on the resources mobilized, their receipt, and the results attributable to these funds, in accordance with UNFCCC guidelines that require accountability for financial flows and impacts. The General Law on Climate Change (LGCC) assigns SEMARNAT, SHCP, and INECC the responsibility for implementing MRV mechanisms, integrating them into the National Communications reports and the Biennial Transparency Reports (BTR) submitted to the Framework Convention.

Institutional coordination occurs through the National Climate Change System (SINACC), which establishes technical committees specialized in climate finance, including representatives from the National Council of Science and Technology (CONACYT), SEMARNAT, SHCP, and INECC. These committees are tasked with validating methodologies, standardizing indicators, and verifying results interministerially. In 2020, INECC, in partnership with CONACYT, published an MRV Methodological Proposal for financing adaptation actions, detailing key performance indicators and data verification procedures for projects at the federal, state, and municipal levels.

Since COP21, the Secretariat of Foreign Affairs (SRE) launched the Open Data Platform on Climate Change, a digital portal that centralizes information on funded initiatives, amounts applied, sources of resources, and results achieved, offering tools for visualization, cross-referencing, and downloading datasets in open formats. In parallel, the Climate Funds Update website independently monitors the flows of multilateral funds destined for Mexico since 2003, detailing approvals, disbursements, and thematic areas of investment, which enriches the official database and serves as an external validation reference.

External audit reports and assessments by independent agencies, such as Sustainalytics and Moody's, also act as quality assurance instruments, ensuring compliance with ESG criteria and validating that green and sustainable bond issuances meet international standards. Furthermore, Banobras and NAFIN periodically publish progress and results reports for their thematic issuances on their transparency portals, submitting them for third-party review and providing details on budget execution, progress indicators, and lessons learned.

The integration of MRV data into official reports—including the third Biennial Update Report (BUR3) of 2022 and the INECC's 2020 Self-Evaluation Report—has made it possible to consolidate inventories of public and private flows, facilitating the identification of sectoral gaps and informing the decision-making of national and international authorities and investors. In December 2024, Mexico presented its first Biennial Transparency Report (BTR1), with a chapter dedicated to climate finance that fully utilized MRV data and standardized indicators to measure the evolution of investments in mitigation and adaptation.

== Initiatives and projects ==
=== Domestic ===
Every year, the Climate Change Fund convenes municipalities and civil society organizations, as in the 2019 edition focused on ecosystem connectivity and restoration of Protected Natural Areas. INECC also supports adaptation programs in city halls, promoting synergies between mitigation and adaptation and offering technical support in climate territorial planning.

=== International ===
The Green Climate Fund, in partnership with the Inter-American Development Bank (IDB), reached agreements in 2019 to channel resources to four projects in Latin America, including energy efficiency initiatives in small and medium-sized Mexican enterprises. The GEF allocated funds to Mexico in areas such as biodiversity and climate, prioritizing sustainable land use and marine conservation projects. In 2021, the “RÍOS” project was presented to the GCF by the Fondo Mexicano para la Conservación de la Naturaleza (FMCN) and received GCF funding and GEF complements via the CONECTA project, aiming to restore river corridors for adaptation in the Gulf and Northwest basins between 2021 and 2026.

=== Energy ===
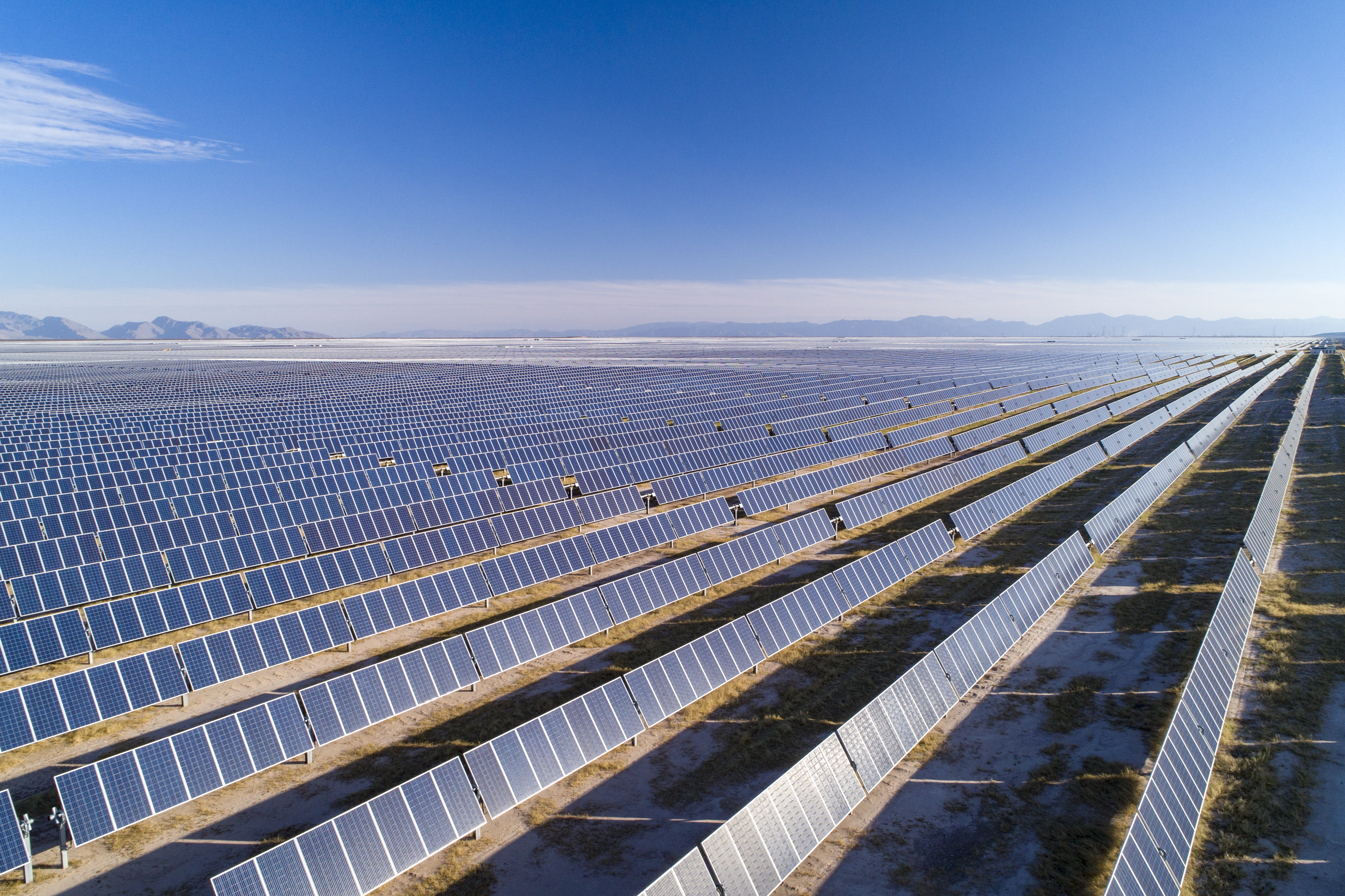
Villanueva solar park, in Coahuila, one of the largest in Latin America

Climate finance has driven large-scale renewable energy generation projects, including the construction of solar parks such as the Villanueva project in Coahuila, considered one of the largest in Latin America. Public development institutions, such as Banobras, issued 14 green bonds in 2023, raising 41,421 million Mexican pesos to finance clean energy projects. IDB programs, in partnership with the International Finance Corporation (IFC) and local intermediaries, created capital market credit lines to support energy efficiency projects in small and medium-sized Mexican companies. In 2019, the GCF signed agreements with the IDB to channel resources to four energy efficiency projects in the region, including initiatives in Mexico. Finally, solar microgrids and distributed generation systems have received support from multilateral funds and the World Bank to expand energy access in rural communities facing high rates of energy poverty in the south of the country.

=== Transportation ===
The transportation sector has been identified by the IDB as one of the three with the greatest mitigation potential in fulfilling Mexico's Nationally Determined Contributions (NDCs), leading to the development of low-carbon infrastructure studies and projects. The IDB's second programmatic operation in Mexico, which began in 2022, financed BRT (Bus Rapid Transit) lines and urban rail corridors, with disbursements totaling US$450 million through 2024, co-financed by the GCF and bilateral agencies.

=== Agriculture ===
Parametric insurance solutions covered more than 10,000 smallholder Mexican farmers against drought and flooding, with two triggers and direct payments to more than 1,400 producers during the 2023 pilot, strengthening the resilience of rural supply chains. The Tripartite project, led by SHCP, IDF, and UNDP, demonstrated the viability of sovereign agricultural protection schemes, expanding the scope to 15,000 beneficiaries by 2025. Experts emphasize that the expansion of these instruments, as analyzed by the consultancy HPL, is essential to consolidate sustainable agroclimatic practices and ensure food security in vulnerable areas.

=== Water and sanitation ===
The IDB structured a financing framework for energy efficiency projects in water and wastewater treatment plants, including pilots in Ciudad Juárez and Querétaro with investments of US$120 million and technical training for local managers. In parallel, the IDB's “Potential Water Reserves” project allocated resources for ecosystem-based adaptation in priority basins, strengthening natural reservoirs and green infrastructure in regions with high water scarcity. The GEF, through its US$249.9 million national portfolio, included initiatives for basic sanitation and integrated stormwater management, contributing to the reduction of flood risks and pollutants.

=== Urban infrastructure and housing ===
The World Resources Institute Mexico (WRI Mexico) supports local governments in developing green drainage plans and urban shade corridors, initiatives that have attracted co-financing from multilateral funds to improve resilience to flooding and extreme heat. In November 2024, the IFC committed $300 million to the Vinte Green PCG Project, expanding access to energy-efficient housing in metropolitan areas, reducing carbon footprints, and housing costs in Mexico.

=== Forests and biodiversity ===
The GEF allocated $120.8 million to regional and national projects in Mexico related to forest conservation, ecosystem restoration, and sustainable management of protected areas, strengthening mitigation and adaptation in strategic biological corridors. In 2024, UNDP recognized six innovative insurance solutions for agriculture and nature, focusing on the protection of forest and agroforestry corridors, illustrating the convergence between insurance and biodiversity conservation.

=== Industry and energy efficiency ===
In January 2024, the IFC provided $150 million in sustainability-linked loans to FIBRA Macquarie Mexico, financing new green industrial parks in five cities and energy-efficiency upgrades in real estate portfolios, reducing emissions from the urban manufacturing sector. This financing model has served as a benchmark for similar projects in sectors such as food and automotive manufacturing, attracting investment from private equity funds interested in ESG.

== Challenges and future prospects ==
The United Nations Environment Programme 's Adaptation Gap Report 2023 estimates an annual global adaptation deficit of US$194–366 billion, with public multilateral flows falling to US$21 billion in 2021, highlighting chronic underfunding even in emerging nations like Mexico. According to the UNFCCC 's Adaptation Finance Gap Update 2023, the mismatch between needs and resources jeopardizes the achievement of territorial resilience targets and exacerbates socioeconomic losses and damage in the country's most vulnerable states. Institutional fragmentation, highlighted by the OECD, limits coordination between federal, state, and municipal agencies, slowing the approval and implementation of priority projects. Furthermore, high foreign exchange hedging costs increase the cost of capital for foreign investors in green projects, which is a structural barrier that reduces the attractiveness of clean energy investments in Mexico. The perception of risk—reinforced by Moody's downgrade of the Mexican government's credit outlook in December 2024—could make public and private loans more expensive, limiting the appetite of international lenders. Finally, technical and data capacity for MRV is still uneven, with insufficient information at the municipal and local levels, which hinders accurate impact assessment and the transparency needed to attract private capital.

The sustainable debt market in Mexico is expected to continue expanding, with projections from the Climate Bonds Initiative indicating a 30% increase in issuance by 2025, driven by the adoption of international standards and growing demand from ESG investors. Sustainable Fitch highlights that regulatory advances in green finance in Latin America will create a more predictable and attractive environment for issuers and investors by 2025. OECD initiatives suggest that strengthening national climate finance strategies, with standardized reporting frameworks and tax incentives, is crucial to reducing transaction costs and expanding the base of eligible projects. Cooperative currency hedging programs, inspired by proposals from the IDB and the World Bank, are also expected to reduce the cost of capital in dollars, stimulating greater flow of resources to renewable energy and sustainable transportation. Finally, the strengthening of innovative adaptation instruments — such as parametric insurance and debt-to-nature swaps — and the consolidation of the Fideicomiso as a vehicle for attracting international donations should expand sources of financing and consolidate Mexico as a regional reference in climate finance by 2030.
