= Climate finance =

Type of investment in the context of climate action

Investments in sustainable energy (clean energy) is an example of climate finance. It has increased due to high fossil fuel prices and growing policy support across various nations. By 2025, investment in the energy transition had grown to about twice that for fossil fuels (oil, natural gas and coal).

Climate finance is an umbrella term for financial resources such as loans, grants, or domestic budget allocations for climate change mitigation, adaptation or resiliency. Finance can come from private and public sources. It can be channeled by various intermediaries such as multilateral development banks or other development agencies. Those agencies are particularly important for the transfer of public resources from developed to developing countries in light of UN Climate Convention obligations that developed countries have.

There are two main sub-categories of climate finance based on different aims. Mitigation finance is investment that aims to reduce global carbon emissions. Adaptation finance aims to respond to the consequences of climate change. Globally, there is a much greater focus on mitigation, accounting for over 90% of spending on climate. Renewable energy is an important growth area for mitigation investment and has growing policy support.

Finance can come from private and public sources, and sometimes the two can intersect to create financial solutions. It is widely recognized that public budgets will be insufficient to meet the total needs for climate finance, and that private finance will be important to close the finance gap. Many different financial models or instruments have been used for financing climate actions. For example green bonds, carbon offsetting, and payment for ecosystem services are some promoted solutions. There is considerable innovation in this area. Transfer of solutions that were not developed specifically for climate finance is also taking place, such as public–private partnerships and blended finance.

While public funding plays an important role in U.S. climate finance, the majority of climate-related investment in the United States is provided by private sources. According to the International Energy Agency, most clean energy and low-carbon investment in advanced economies is financed through private capital, including corporate balance sheets, project finance, bank lending, and capital markets, with public policy primarily serving to reduce risk and improve investment incentives. Public climate policies such as tax credits, loan guarantees, and regulatory standards are therefore designed not only to fund projects directly but also to mobilize significantly larger volumes of private investment toward mitigation and resilience objectives.

There are many challenges with climate finance. Firstly, there are difficulties with measuring and tracking financial flows. Secondly, there are also questions around equitable financial support to developing countries for cutting emissions and adapting to impacts. It is also difficult to provide suitable incentives for investments from the private sector.

== Definition and context ==
Climate finance is "finance that aims at reducing emissions, and enhancing sinks of greenhouse gases and aims at reducing vulnerability of, and maintaining and increasing the resilience of, human and ecological systems to negative climate change impacts", as defined by the United Nations Framework Convention on Climate Change (UNFCCC) Standing Committee on Finance.

The terminology of sustainable finance has evolved over time alongside policy frameworks and market practices. A review study in 2026 demonstrated that early research primarily used fragmented concepts such as ethical finance, socially responsible investment, and environmental finance, before the gradual consolidation of the field around ESG-based sustainable finance. Their periodization clarifies the differences and similarities between the rival terms (carbon finance, climate finance, environmental finance, green finance and sustainable finance). The authors distinguish three main periods: The first period spans from the 1970s to 2010. During this time, the theoretical foundations were established, and following the publication of the Brundtland Report, the first green financial instruments and the first targeted research emerged. The establishment of the Green Climate Fund (2010) was followed by the eras of carbon, environmental, and climate finance. Collectively, this constitutes the era of early sustainable finance research, which lasted until 2021, the year of COP26. This is followed by the era of mature research, characterized by green and sustainable finance.

=== UNFCCC obligations ===
Under the UN Climate Convention, climate finance refers to transfers of public money from high income countries to low and middle income countries. This would be in light of their obligations to provide new and additional financial resources. The 2015 United Nations Climate Change Conference introduced a new era for climate finance, policies, and markets. The Paris Agreement, which was adopted at that conference, defined a global action plan to put the world on track to avoid dangerous climate change by limiting global warming to well below 2 °C above pre-industrial levels. The agreement covers climate change mitigation, adaptation, and finance. The financing element includes climate-specific support mechanisms and financial aid for mitigation and adaptation activities. The aims of these activities are to speed up the energy transition towards a low-carbon economy and climate-resilient growth.

At the 16th Conference of the Parties in 2010 (Cancun 2010) developed countries committed to the goal of mobilizing jointly US$100 billion per year by 2020 to address the needs of developing countries. The decision by the 21st Conference of the Parties (Paris 2015) also included the commitment to continue their existing collective mobilization goal through 2025. In 2025, a new goal is expected to be adopted.

However, the amount of finance actually provided was estimated to be well below what had been targeted. According to OECD figures, climate finance provided and mobilized reached $83.3bn in 2020 and $89.6bn in 2021. This means that the US$100 billion per year by 2020 target has been missed.

=== Policies to Mobilize Private Capital ===
Tax credits (ITC, PTC) and production incentives are explicitly designed to "crowd in" private investment in renewable energy, storage, and low-carbon technologies. The Inflation Reduction Act (IRA) and the Bipartisan Infrastructure Law employ long-term predictable incentives, loan guarantees, and public co-investment to lower the risk and cost of capital for investments in climate finance projects. Empirical studies indicate that public policy and concessional finance can mobilize significant private capital flows into clean energy.

== Global estimates of financing needs ==
Global climate finance was estimated to have reached around $1.3 trillion per year in 2021/2022. However, much more is needed to keep global temperature rises within 1.5°C and avoid the worst impacts of climate change. A 2024 report estimated that climate finance flows must increase by at least sixfold on 2021/2022 levels, reaching $8.5 trillion per year by 2030.

== Subcategories ==
Mitigation finance is investment that aims to reduce global carbon emissions. Adaptation finance aims to respond to the consequences of climate change. These two subcategories of climate finance are normally considered separately. However, the two areas are known to have many trade-offs, co-benefits and overlapping policy considerations. The Paris Agreement is an important international agreement between governments, which has also helped to engage financial institutions in the climate agenda. The third aim of the Agreement (article 2.1 c) is to make finance flows consistent with the mitigation and adaptation goals of the agreement. The Agreement called for a balance of climate finance between adaptation and mitigation.

=== Finance for mitigation ===
Electrified transport and renewable energy are key areas of investment for climate change mitigation via an energy transition.

China's count of multi-country patent filings has surged since the mid-2010s, leading in batteries and solar, though Europe still dominates in wind energy and smart grids. China also leads in highly cited publications in global peer-reviewed journals.

Global climate finance is heavily focused on mitigation. Key sectors for investment have been renewable energy, energy efficiency and transport. There has also been an increase in international climate finance towards the 100 billion target. Most of the estimated US$83.3 billion provided to developing countries in 2020, was targeted at mitigation (US$48.6 billion, or 58%). On a worldwide scale, mitigation financing accounts for over 90% of investment in climate finance. Around 70% of this mitigation money has gone towards renewable energy, however low-carbon mobility is a key development sector. Global energy investment has increased since the 2020 COVID-19 pandemic crisis. However, the crisis has placed great additional strain on the global economy, debt and the availability of finance, which are expected to be felt in years to come.

==== Mitigation costs and mitigation financing needs ====
In 2010, the World Development Report preliminary estimates of financing needs for mitigation and adaptation activities in developing countries range from $140 to 175 billion per year for mitigation over the next 20 years with associated financing needs of $265–565 billion and $30–100 billion a year over the period 2010–2050 for adaptation.

The International Energy Agency's 2011 World Energy Outlook (WEO) estimates that in order to meet the growing demand for energy through 2035, $16.9 trillion in new investment for new power generation is projected, with renewable energy (RE) comprising 60% of the total. The capital required to meet projected energy demand through 2030 amounts to $1.1 trillion per year on average, distributed (almost evenly) between the large emerging economies (China, India, Brazil, etc.) and the remaining developing countries. It is believed that over the next 15 years, the world will require about $90 trillion in new infrastructure – most of it in developing and middle-income countries. The IEA estimates that limiting the rise in global temperature to below 2 Celsius by the end of the century will require an average of $3.5 trillion a year in energy sector investments until 2050.

A meta-analysis from 2023 investigated the "required technology-level investment shifts for climate-relevant infrastructure until 2035" within the EU, and found these are "most drastic for power plants, electricity grids and rail infrastructure", ~€87 billion above the planned budgets in the near-term (2021–25), and in need of sustainable finance policies.

=== Finance for adaptation ===
Finance is an important enabler for climate adaptation, for both developed and developing countries. It can come from a variety of sources. Public finance is provided directly by governments or via intermediaries such as development finance institutions (e.g. MDBs or other development agencies). It can also be channeled through multilateral climate funds. Some multilateral climate funds have a specific focus on adaptation within their mandate. These include the Green Climate Fund, the CIFs and the Adaptation Fund. Private finance can come from commercial banks, institutional investors, other private equity or other companies or from household or community funding. The vast majority of tracked finance (around 98%) has originated from public sources. This is partly because of the lack of a well-defined income stream or business case with an attractive return on investment on projects.

Finance can be delivered through a range of instruments including grants or subsidies, concessional and non-concessional (i.e. market) loans as well as other debt instruments, equity issuances (listed or unlisted shares) or can be delivered through own funds, such as savings. The largest proportions of adaptation finance have been invested in infrastructure, energy, built environment, agriculture, forestry/nature and water-related projects.

Only around 4-8% of total climate finance has been allocated to adaptation. The vast majority has been allocated to mitigation with only around 1-2% on multiple objectives.

==== Adaptation costs and adaptation financing needs ====
Adaptation costs are the costs of planning, preparing for, facilitating and implementing adaptation. Adaptation benefits can be estimated in terms of reduced damages from the effects of climate change. In economic terms, the cost to benefit ratio of adaptation shows that each dollar can deliver large benefits. For example, it is estimated that every US$1 billion invested in adaptation against coastal flooding leads to a US$14 billion reduction in economic damages. Investing in more resilient infrastructure in developing countries would provide an average of $4 in benefit for each $1 invested. In other words, a small percentage increase in investment costs can mitigate the potentially very large disruption to infrastructure costs.

A 2023 study found the overall adaptation costs for all developing countries to be around US$215 billion per year for the period up to 2030. The highest adaptation expenses are for river flood protection, infrastructure and coastal protection. They also found that in most cases, adaptation costs will be significantly higher by 2050.

It is difficult to estimate both the costs of adaptation and the adaptation finance needs. The costs of adaptation varies with the objective and the level of adaptation required and what is acceptable as residual, i.e. 'unmanaged' risk. Similarly, adaptation finance needs vary depending on the overall adaptation plans for the country, city, or region. It also depends on the assessment methods used. A 2023 study analysed country-level information submitted to the UNFCCC in National Adaptation Plans and Nationally Determined Contributions (85 countries). It estimated global adaptation needs of developing countries annual average to be US$387 billion, for the period up to 2030.

Both the cost estimates and needs estimates have high uncertainty. Adaptation costs are usually derived from economic modelling analysis (global or sectoral models). Adaptation needs are based on programme and project-level costing. These programmes depend on the high level adaptation instrument – such as a plan, policy or strategy. For many developing countries, the implementation of certain actions specified in the plans is conditional on receiving international support. in these countries, a majority (85%) of finance needs are expected to be met from international public climate finance, i.e. funding from developed to developing countries. There is less data available for adaptation costs and adaptation finance needs in high income countries. Data show that per capita needs tend to increase with income level, but these countries can also afford to invest more domestically.

==== Current levels of financing and the finance gap ====
Between 2017 and 2021, total international public finance to developing countries for climate adaptation has remained well below US$30 billion per year. This equals about 33% of the total public climate finance, with an additional 14% spending on cross-cutting activities (supporting both adaptation and mitigation). This includes finance from multilateral development banks, bilateral agencies and multilateral climate funds as the three largest types of provider. 63% of the adaptation-specific funding was provided as loans, and 36% as grants. Disbursement of funds for adaptation, at 66% of the amounts committed, is much lower than for mitigation. This indicates difficulty and complexity of implementation.

The adaptation finance gap is the difference between estimated costs of adaptation and the amount of finance available for adaptation. Based on data over 2017–2021, the estimated costs or needs are around 10-18 times as much as current levels of public flows. Domestic budgets and private climate finance for adaptation are not included in these figures. The gap has widened compared to previous assessments. Increasing both international and domestic public finance and mobilising private finance can help to close the finance gap. Other options include remittances, increased finance for small businesses, and reform of the international financial system, for example through changes in managing vulnerable countries' debt burden.

A report published in January 2025 found that low carbon energy investments reached 2.1 trillion dollars, but the rate of growth was more than 2 times lower in 2024 (11%) in comparison to the 3 previous years. In the years 2021, 2022, 2023, the rate of growth did not changed much, staying at 24%-29%. Investments fall in the EU and the UK and rested the same in the USA. Investment need to be $5.6 trillion in average every year from 2025 to 2030, to stay in line with the Paris Agreement.

== Types of finance ==
=== Multilateral climate finance ===
==== Multilateral climate funds ====
The multilateral climate funds (i.e. governed by multiple national governments) are important for paying out money in climate finance. As of 2022, there are five multilateral climate funds coordinated by the UNFCCC. These are the Green Climate Fund (GCF), the Adaptation Fund (AF), the Least Developed Countries Fund (LDCF), the Special Climate Change Fund (SCCF), the Global Environment Facility (GEF), and the Just Energy Transition Partnerships. The largest of these, the GCF, was formed in 2010.

The other main multilateral fund, Climate Investment Funds (CIFs), is coordinated by the World Bank. The Climate Investment Funds has been important in climate finance since 2008. It comprises two funds, the Clean Technology Fund and the Strategic Climate Fund. The latter sponsors innovative approaches to existing climate change challenges, whereas the former invests in clean technology projects in developing countries.

Also in 2022, nations agreed on a proposal to establish a multilateral loss and damage fund to support communities in averting, minimizing, and addressing damages and risks where adaptation is not enough or comes too late.

Some multilateral climate change funds work through grant-only programmes. Other multilateral climate funds use a wider range of financing instruments, including grants, concessional loans, equity (shares in an entity) and risk mitigation options. These are intended to crowd in other sources of finance, whether from domestic governments, other donors, or the private sector.

==== Multilateral development banks ====
Multilateral development banks (MDBs) are important providers of international climate finance. MDBs are financial vehicles created by governments to support economic and social efforts, predominantly in developing countries. The MDBs goals usually mirror the aid and collaboration regulations of their founding members. They complement the programmes of (national government) members' bilateral development agencies, allowing them to work in more countries and at a larger scale. The Paris Agreement also provided momentum for the MDBs to align their investments and strategies with climate goals, and in 2018 the MDBs collectively announced a joint framework for financial flows. The MDBs use the widest range of financing instruments including grants, investment loans, equity, guarantees, policy-based financing and results-based financing.

The World Bank uses money contributed by governments and companies in OECD countries to purchase project-based greenhouse gas emission reductions in developing countries and countries with economies in transition. These include the BioCarbon Fund Initiative, which is a public-private partnership providing finance for the land use sector. The Partnership for Market Readiness focuses on market-based mechanisms. The Forest Carbon Partnership Facility explores use of carbon market revenues for reducing emissions from deforestation and forest degradation (REDD+).

Internationally, U.S.-supported multilateral initiatives also deploy blended finance to encourage private investment in developing-country mitigation and adaptation projects.

=== Bilateral climate finance ===
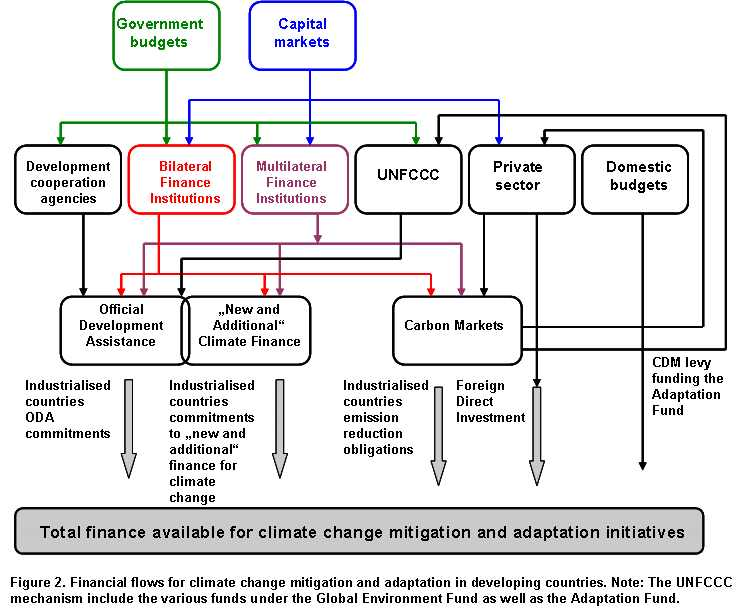
Financial flows for climate change mitigation and adaptation in developing countries.

Bilateral institutions include development cooperation agencies and national development banks. Until quite recently they have been the largest contributors to climate finance, but since 2020 bilateral flows have decreased whilst multilateral funding has grown. Some bilateral donors have thematic or sectoral priorities, whilst many also have geopolitical preferences for working in certain countries or regions.

Bilateral institutions include donors such as the USAID, the Japan International Cooperation Agency (JICA), Germany's KfW Development Bank and the UK Foreign, Commonwealth and Development Office (FCDO). Many bilateral agencies also make donations through multilateral channels and this allows them to work in more countries and at a larger scale. However the overall international climate finance system (for financial flows from developed to developing countries) is complex and fragmented, with overlapping mandates and objectives. This creates significant co-ordination problems.

=== Domestic public climate finance ===
Financial flows and expenditures by national governments on climate are significant. Domestic targets on addressing climate change are set out in national strategies and plans, including those submitted to the UNFCCC under the Paris Agreement. For many developing countries, the plans submitted include targets attached to international financial and technical support (i.e. conditional targets).

National-level coordination of climate funding is important for meeting these domestic targets, and in the case of developing countries, also for accessing international funding. For all countries and regions, it is recognized that public funding will not be sufficient to meet all finance needs. This means that policy makers need to take a strategic approach through using public funding to leverage additional private finance. The U.S. Department of Energy's Loan Programs Office has been especially prominent in using federal credit support to enable private sector financing for innovative clean technologies such as advanced batteries, hydrogen infrastructure, and carbon management projects. Other funding can come from financial institutions such as banks, pension funds, insurance companies and asset managers. Sometimes, public and private sources of funding can be blended into a single solution, for example in insurance, where public funds provide part of the capital.

=== Private climate finance ===
Public finance has traditionally been a significant source of infrastructure investment. However, public budgets are often insufficient for larger and more complex infrastructure projects, particularly in lower-income countries. Climate-compatible investments often have higher investment needs than conventional (fossil fuel) measures, and may also carry higher financial risks because the technologies are not proven or the projects have high upfront costs. If countries are going to access the scale of funding required, it is critical to consider the full spectrum of funding sources and their requirements, as well as the different mechanisms available from them, and how they can be combined. There is therefore growing recognition that private finance will be needed to cover the financing shortfall.

Private investors could be drawn to sustainable urban infrastructure projects where a sufficient return on investment is forecast based on project income flows or low-risk government debt repayments. Bankability and creditworthiness are therefore prerequisites to attracting private finance. Potential sources of climate finance include commercial banks, pension funds, insurance companies, asset managers, sovereign wealth funds, venture capital (such as fixed income and listed equity products), infrastructure funds and bank lending (including loans from credit unions). They also include companies from other sectors such as renewable energy or water companies, and individual households and communities. These different investor types will have different risk-return expectations and investment horizons, and projects will need to be structured appropriately. For example, there are credit unions specialized in climate finance, such as the US-based Clean Energy Credit Union which finances a range of clean energy projects including solar PV systems, electric vehicles and electric bicycles. Ceres released a report which stated that credit unions have an essential role to play in mobilizing stakeholders to address climate change, and outlines seven steps credit unions should take to address climate risk.

During the COVID-19 pandemic, climate change was addressed by 43% of EU enterprises. Despite the pandemic's effect on businesses, the percentage of firms planning climate-related investment rose to 47%. This was a rise from 2020, when the percentage of climate related investment was at 41%. Climate investment in Europe has been growing in the 2020s. However, the need for the EU's "Fit for 55" climate package remains 356 billion euros a year. Since 2020, US firms' desire to innovate has increased, whereas European firms' has decreased. As of 2022, spending in climate for European enterprises has climbed by 10%, reaching 53% on average. This has been especially noticeable in Central and Eastern Europe at 25% and in small and medium-sized firms (SMEs) with a 22% increase in climate financing.

Carbon offsetting through voluntary carbon markets is a way for private sector enterprises to invest in projects that avoid or reduce emissions elsewhere. The original carbon offsetting and credit mechanisms were "flexibility mechanisms" defined in the Kyoto Protocol. They comprise the compliance carbon market, focusing on trading/crediting (obligatory) emission reductions between countries. In voluntary carbon markets, companies or individuals use carbon offsets to meet the goals they set themselves for reducing emissions. Voluntary carbon markets are growing significantly. Mechanisms such as REDD+ include private sector contributions via voluntary carbon markets. However, the relative flows of private finance from developed to developing countries remain quite small. It is estimated that over 90% of private climate flows remain within national borders.

Venture capital investment in climate technology continues to grow. According to a 2024 report by J.P. Morgan, battery and grid technology, clean mobility, food & agriculture technology are the highest-funded sectors, which reflects the demand for electric vehicle infrastructure, energy efficiency, and more sustainable food production.

== Financial instruments ==
Several different financial models or instruments have been used for financing climate actions. The overall business model may include several of these financing mechanisms combined to create the climate solution. Financial models can belong to different categories e.g. public budgets, debt, equity, land value capture or revenue generating models etc.

=== Debt-for-climate swaps ===
Debt-for-climate swaps happen where debt accumulated by a country is repaid upon fresh discounted terms agreed between the debtor and creditor, where repayment funds in local currency are redirected to domestic projects that boost climate mitigation and adaptation activities. Climate mitigation activities that can benefit from debt-for-climate swaps includes projects that enhance carbon sequestration, renewable energy and conservation of biodiversity as well as oceans.

For instance, Argentina succeeded in carrying out such a swap which was implemented by the Environment Minister at the time, Romina Picolotti. The value of debt addressed was $38,100,000 and the environmental swap was $3,100,000 which was redirected to conservation of biodiversity, forests and other climate mitigation activities. Seychelles in collaboration with the Nature Conservancy also undertook a similar debt-for-nature swap where $27 million of debt was redirected to establish marine parks, ocean conservation and ecotourism activities.

=== Green bonds ===
A green bond is a fixed-income financial instrument (bond) which is used to fund projects that have positive environmental benefits. When referring to climate change mitigation projects they are also known as climate bonds. Green bonds follow the Green Bond Principles stated by the International Capital Market Association (ICMA), and the proceeds from the issuance of which are to be used for the pre-specified types of projects. The categories of eligible green projects include for example: Renewable energy, energy efficiency, pollution prevention and control, environmentally sustainable management of living natural resources and land use, terrestrial and aquatic biodiversity, clean transportation, climate change adaptation.

Like normal bonds, green bonds can be issued by governments, multi-national banks or corporations and the issuing organization repays the bond and any interest. The main difference is that the funds will be used only for positive climate change or environmental projects. This allows investors to target their environmental, social, and corporate governance (ESG) goals by investing in them. They are similar to Sustainability Bonds but sustainability bonds also need to have a positive social outcome.

The growth of bond markets provides increasing opportunities to finance the implementation of the Sustainable Development Goals (SDGs), Nationally Determined Contributions and other green growth projects. A UN conference held on the Sustainable Development Goals in 2021 emphasized the importance of sustainable bonds, and stated that of the approximately €300 trillion of financial assets on the markets, only 1% would be needed to achieve the SDGs.

Empirical evidence suggests that green bond issuance is associated with lower carbon emissions from issuing jurisdictions and may offer modest financing advantages, such as lower yields or broader investor bases.

=== Blue finance ===
Blue finance refers to financial processes which reduce the carbon footprints of ocean-related economic activities and affect the marine environment positively. It is part of the broader framework of sustainable finance. It overlaps with climate finance in funding approaches which harness the ocean for climate change mitigation and adaptation. These include developing marine renewable energies (for example offshore wind turbines) and zero-emissions shipping, protecting and restoring coastal ecosystems (including mangrove forests, seagrass meadows).

According to the World Economic Forum, US$175 billion of annual investment in blue finance would be needed to achieve the Sustainable Development Goal most relevant to the blue economy (SDG 14, 'Life Below Water'). However, the current investment is far below what is needed for a sustainable use of oceans, and number 14 is the most underfunded one of the 17 SDGs. Financial instruments used in blue finance include blue bonds, the marine equivalent of green bonds, which raise capital specifically for ocean conservation and sustainable marine activity.

=== Commercial Lending and Sustainability-Linked Loans ===
Sustainability-linked loans (SLLs), in which interest rates adjust based on achievement of emissions reduction or efficiency targets, have expanded rapidly among U.S. corporations.

=== Offsetting (credit trading) ===
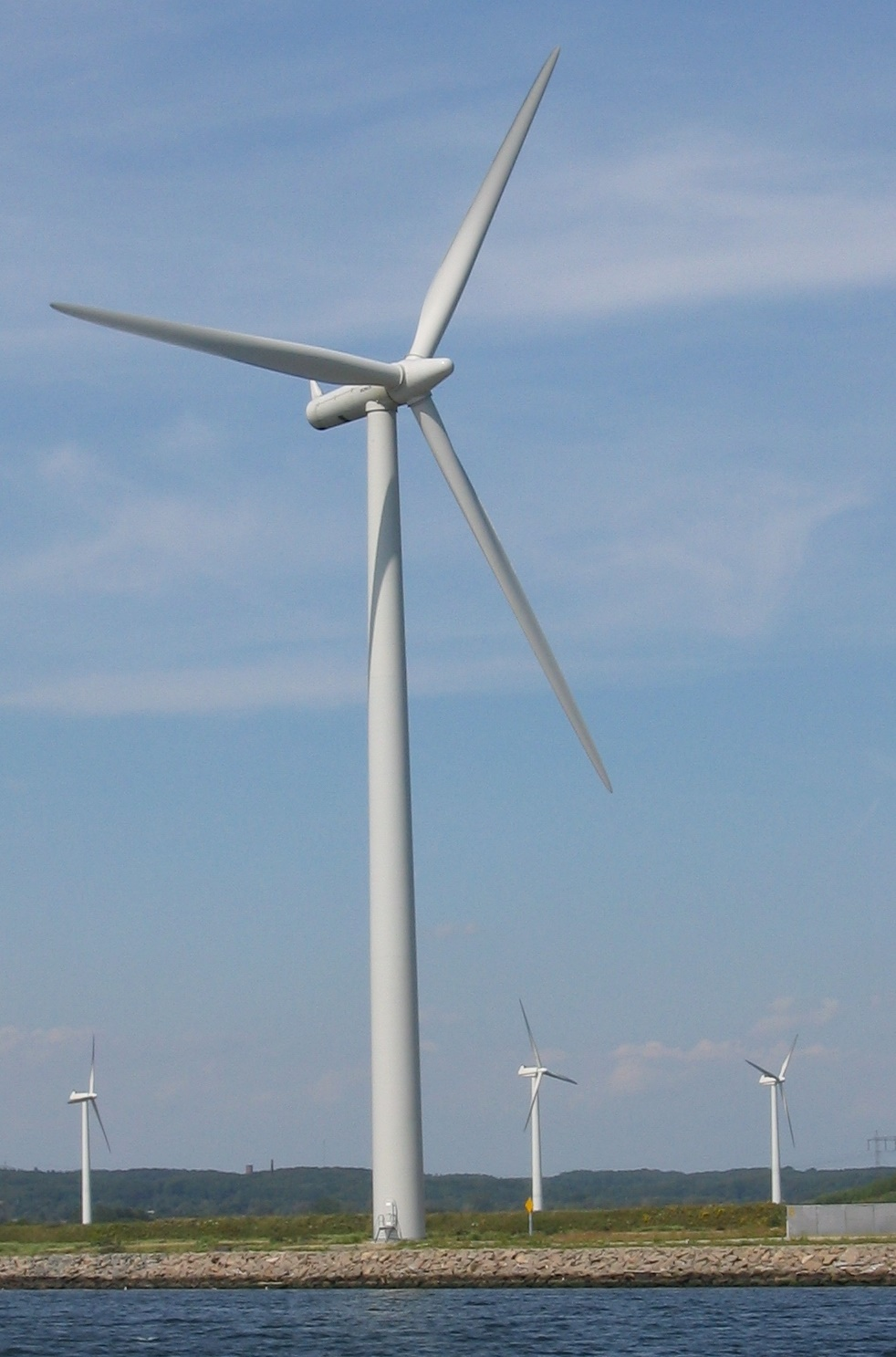
Renewable energy projects, such as these wind turbines near Aalborg, Denmark, constitute one common type of carbon offset project.

A carbon credit is a tradable instrument (typically a virtual certificate) that conveys a claim to have avoided greenhouse gas (GHG) emissions or to have enhanced removal of GHG from the atmosphere. One carbon credit represents the avoided or enhanced removal of one metric ton of carbon dioxide or its carbon dioxide-equivalent (CO_{2}e).

=== Venture capital and early-stage financing ===
Although smaller in volume relative to project finance and corporate investment, venture capital (VC) funds a significant share of early-stage climate technology innovation in areas such as batteries, hydrogen, carbon capture, and grid software. U.S. climate-tech VC investment grew markedly between 2015 and 2023, reflecting increased investor interest and expanding federal incentives. Academic analyses note that VC plays a crucial role in developing frontier technologies but faces structural challenges due to long commercialization timelines and high capital intensity.

=== Other financial instruments ===
The following financial instruments can also be used for climate finance but were not developed specifically for climate finance:

- Revenue-generating models (subscription business model, fee-for-service); Revenue generation through for example water-user fees or tariffs can incentivise investment in climate projects.
- Revolving Loan Fund
- Public–private partnership
- Blended finance
- Land Value Capture

== Finance committed and dispersed ==
In 2019, CPI estimated that annual climate finance reached more than US$600 billion. Data for 2021/2022 showed it to be almost US$1.3 trillion, with most of the increase coming from acceleration in mitigation finance (renewable energy and transport sectors). These figures take into account all countries and both private and public finance. The bulk of this finance is raised and spent domestically (84% in 2021/2022). International public climate finance from developed to developing countries was found to be well below US$70 billion per year for the period 2017–2021. The OECD, which includes export credits and mobilised private finance, estimated 2021 flows to be US$89.6 billion. There are differences in estimates due to different definitions and methods used.

As of November 2020, development banks and private finance had not reached the US$100 billion per year investment stipulated in the UN climate negotiations for 2020. However, in the face of the COVID-19 pandemic's economic downturn, 450 development banks pledged to fund a "Green recovery" in developing countries.

In 2016, the four main multilateral climate funds approved $2.78 billion of project support. India received the most single-country support, followed by Ukraine and Chile. Tuvalu received the most funding per person, followed by Samoa and Dominica. The US is the largest donor across the four funds, while Norway makes the largest contribution relative to population size. Climate financing by the world's six largest multilateral development banks (MDBs) rose to a seven-year high of $35.2 billion in 2017. According to OECD figures, climate finance provided and mobilized reached $83.3bn in 2020. Another study reported that the money given for climate change was only worth about a third of what was said ($21–24.5bn).

In 2009, developed countries had committed to jointly mobilize $100 billion annually in climate finance by 2020 to support developing countries in reducing emissions and adapting to climate change. Subsequent years confirmed this trend: according to an OECD report published on 21 May 2026, developed countries provided and mobilised $132.8 billion in 2023 and $136.7 billion in 2024, marking the third consecutive year in which the $100 billion annual goal was met.

=== European Investment Bank ===
Since 2012, the European Investment Bank (EIB) has provided €170 billion in climate funding, which has funded over €600 billion in programs to mitigate emissions and help people respond to climate change and biodiversity depletion across Europe and the world. In 2022, the Bank's funding for climate change and environmental sustainability projects totaled €36.5 billion. This includes €35 billion for initiatives supporting climate action and €15.9 billion for programs supporting environmental sustainability goals. Projects with combined climate action and environmental sustainability advantages received €14.3 billion in funding. Over 2021–2030, the Bank wants to assist €1 trillion in green investment. Currently, only 5.4% of the Bank's loans for climate action are dedicated to climate adaptation, but funding did increase significantly in 2022, reaching €1.9 billion.

The European Investment Bank plans to support €1 trillion of climate investment by 2030 as part of the European Green Deal. In 2019 the EIB Board of Directors approved new targets for climate action and environmental sustainability to phase out fossil fuel financing. The bank will increase the share of its financing for to climate action and environmental sustainability to 50% by 2025 The European Investment Bank Group announced it will align all financing with the Paris Agreement by the end of 2020. The bank aims "to play a leading role in mobilising the finance needed to achieve the worldwide commitment to keep global warming well below 2˚C, aiming for 1.5˚C." EIB loans to the sustainable blue economy totalled €6.7 billion between 2018 and 2022, generating €23.8 billion in investments, and €2.8 billion in maritime renewable energy. In the same timeframe, the Bank granted around €881 million to assist in the management of wastewater, stormwater, and solid waste to decrease pollution entering the ocean. In 2023, EIB energy loans climbed to €21.3 billion, up from €11.6 billion in 2020. This funding supports energy efficiency, renewable energy, innovation, storage, and new energy network infrastructure.

The EIB, the European Commission, and Breakthrough Energy, launched by Bill Gates in 2015, have collaborated to build large-scale green tech initiatives in Europe and encourage investment in crucial climate technologies.

According to a 2020 Municipality Survey, 56% of European Union municipalities increased climate investment, while 66% believe their climate investment over the previous three years has been insufficient. In the three years preceding the pandemic, over two-thirds of EU towns boosted infrastructure investments, with a 56% focus on climate change mitigation.

Local municipalities contribute 45% of total government investment. Basic infrastructure, such as public transportation or water utilities, is included in their investment. They also update public facilities including schools, hospitals, and social housing. Prioritizing energy efficiency in these projects will assist Europe in meeting climate targets.

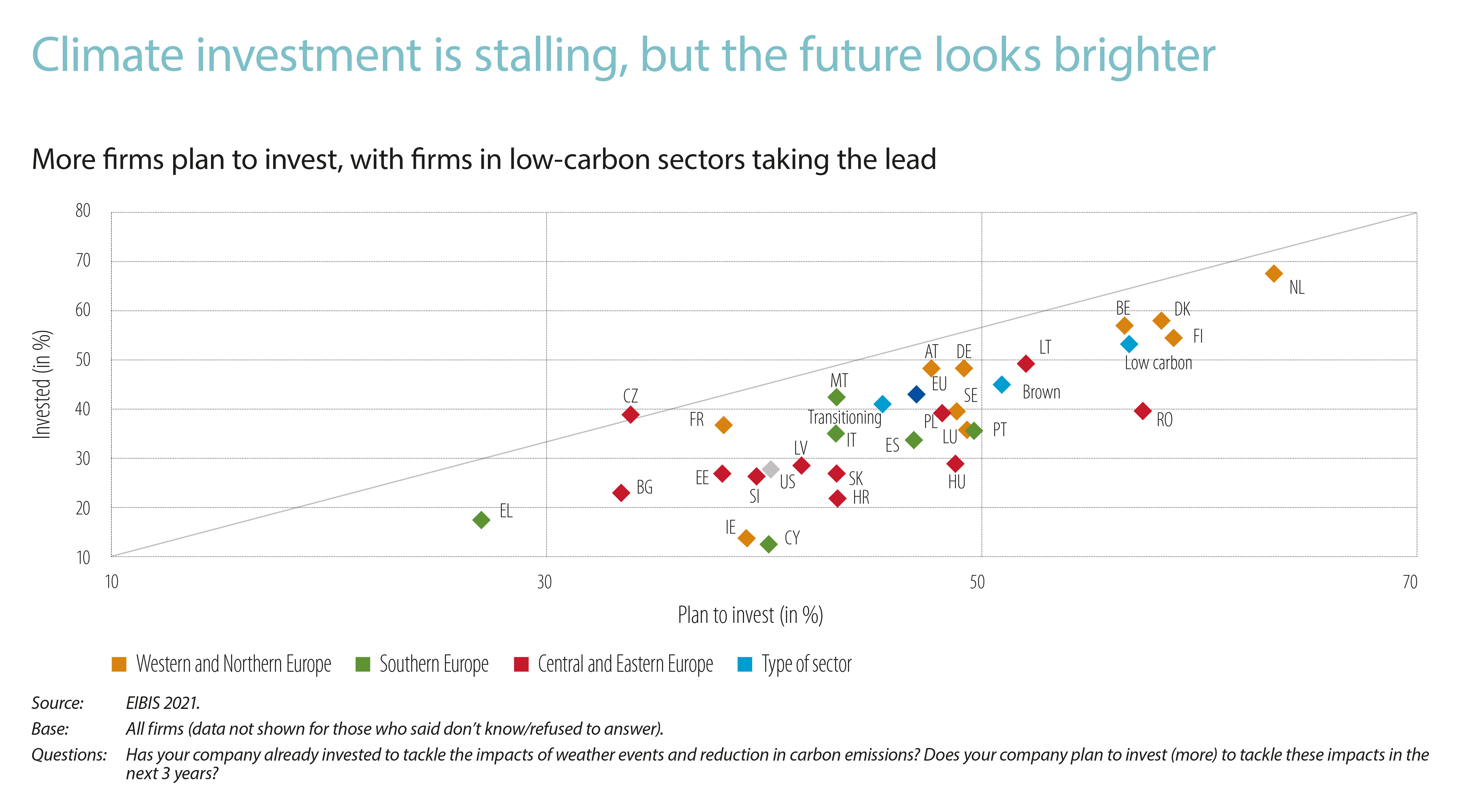
More firms (in Europe) plan to invest in low-carbon sectors, and to tackle climate change.

Eastern European and Central Asian businesses fall behind their Southern European counterparts in terms of the average quality of their green management practices, notably in terms of specified energy consumption and emissions objectives. External variables, such as consumer pressure and energy taxes, are more relevant than firm-level features, such as size and age, in influencing the quality of green management practices. Firms with less financial limitations and stronger green management practices are more likely to invest in a bigger variety of green initiatives. Energy efficiency investments are good to both the bottom line and the environment.

== Challenges ==
=== Tracking climate finance flows ===
Information on climate finance flows is much better for international climate finance than for domestic climate finance. International public finance from multilateral and bilateral sources can be tagged to specify that it is targeting climate mitigation or adaptation or both (i.e. is cross-cutting). A number of initiatives are underway to monitor and track flows of international climate finance. For example, analysts at Climate Policy Initiative (CPI) have tracked public and private sector climate finance flows from a variety of sources on a yearly basis since 2011.

This work has fed into the United Nations Framework Convention on Climate Change Biennial Assessment and Overview of Climate Finance Flows and in the IPCC Fifth Assessment Report and IPCC Sixth Assessment Report chapters on climate finance. These suggest a need for more efficient monitoring of climate finance flows. In particular, they suggest that funds can do better at synchronizing their reporting of data, being consistent in the way that they report their figures, and providing detailed information on the implementation of projects and programs over time. There is also a need for improved reporting and tracking by domestic and private climate finance actors. This could be achieved through national regulations for mandatory and standardized disclosure.

=== Climate finance gap ===
Research finds substantially lower bilateral climate finance numbers than current official estimates. Reasons are among others a lack of universally agreed-upon definitions of what qualifies as international climate finance and no oversight. This has led to an inclusion of non-climate projects, a lack of transparency and ultimately a credibility issue regarding official international climate finance reporting.

Analysis by the Climate Policy Initiative shows that adaptation finance represents only a small fraction of total climate finance flows, largely due to difficulties in generating predictable revenue streams and monetizing resilience benefits. As a result, adaptation investments in areas such as flood protection, heat resilience, and community infrastructure continue to rely primarily on public funding, grants, and insurance-based mechanisms.s

The estimates of the climate finance gap - that is, the shortfall in investment - vary according to the geographies, sectors and activities included, timescale and phasing, target and the underlying assumptions. The 2018 Biennial Assessment estimated financing needs for mitigation between 2020 and 2030 to be US$1.7-2.4 trillion per year.

=== Moral responsibility and legal obligation ===
Developed countries are responsible for the majority of cumulative greenhouse gas emissions since the industrialization and generally have greater capacity to provide support. Therefore, it is argued, that they have a moral responsibility and a legal obligation to provide finance to help developing countries undertake climate action. At the 16th Conference of the Parties in 2010 developed countries committed to the goal of mobilizing jointly US$100 billion per year by 2020 to address the needs of developing countries, and the decision by the 2015 United Nations Climate Change Conference also included the commitment to continue their existing collective mobilization goal through 2025. However, these agreements don't offer guidance on how to allocate climate finance responsibility to individual countries.

Several institutions and researchers have developed methodologies to determine country-specific contribution shares based on equity-principles. All models have in common that they at least use one wealth variable (e.g. share of GDP or GNI) to consider the ability to pay and an emission variable (share of CO_{2} or GHG) to reflect emission responsibility. Some models additionally consider countries' population or their willingness to pay. Furthermore, another proposal of a mechanism suggests to incorporate forward-looking data in so-called dynamic models. For the dynamic components, the share of GDP is determined by a 2030 forecast adjusted for expected climate damages and the share of GHGs covers future emissions up to 2030 and accounts for unconditional emission reduction targets submitted by the countries where available.

=== Limits of Private Finance in Meeting Climate Goals ===
Several international institutions caution that private capital alone cannot close the climate finance gap. The International Monetary Fund and OECD emphasize that many climate investments, particularly in adaptation, early-stage innovation, and vulnerable communities, generate high social benefits but limited private returns. As a result, sustained public finance, regulatory frameworks, and risk-sharing mechanisms are required to align private investment with long-term climate objectives.

=== Incentivizing private investment in adaptation ===
Climate change adaptation is a much more complex investment area than mitigation. This is mainly because of the lack of a well-defined income stream or business case with an attractive return on investment on projects. There are several specific challenges for private investment:

- Adaptation is often needed in non-market sectors or is focused on public goods that benefit many. So there is a shortage of projects that are attractive to the private sector;
- There is a mismatch between the timing of investments needed in the short term and the benefits that may occur in the medium or long term. Future returns are less attractive to investors than short-term returns;
- There is a lack of information about investment opportunities. This especially concerns uncertainties associated with future impacts and benefits. These are key considerations when returns may accrue over longer timeframes;
- There are gaps in human resources and capacities to design adaptation projects and understand financial implications of legal, economic and regulatory frameworks.

However, there is considerable innovation in this area. This is increasing the potential for private sector finance to play a larger role in closing the adaptation finance gap. Economists state that climate adaptation initiatives should be an urgent priority for business investment. Reporting on voluntary carbon market reform has discussed the Integrity Council for the Voluntary Carbon Market (ICVCM) and its Core Carbon Principles benchmark for carbon credit quality and labelling.

== See also ==
- Adaptation Fund
- Carbon emission trading – Approach to limit climate change
- Climate Investment Funds – Multilateral climate fund
- Climate finance in Jamaica
- Climate finance in Trinidad and Tobago
- Climate-related asset stranding – Former physical asset, now a liability
- Eco-investing – Investment strategy
- Fossil fuel divestment – Divestment in companies that extract fossil fuels
- Global Environment Facility – Multilateral environmental foundation for climate protection
- Green Climate Fund – Fund helping developing countries to counter climate change
- Sustainable finance – Finance with an environmental objective
