= Climate finance in Trinidad and Tobago =

Climate finance in Trinidad and Tobago includes a mixture of domestic and internationally sourced funding for climate change adaptation, mitigation and resilience.

== Nationally determined contributions ==
Trinidad and Tobago is a party to the United Nations Framework Convention on Climate Change (UNFCCC) and has signed and ratified the Paris Agreement. The country's nationally determined contribution is to avoid 103 million tonnes CO2e of emissions at a projected cost of US$2 billion.

== Major financial support ==
Between 2010 and 2020, major climate finance for the Government of Trinidad and Tobago came from the national budget, European Union Environment Programme, the Global Environment Facility, the United Nations Environment Programme, and the Green Climate Fund. The largest single investment consisted TT$500 million (approximately US$72 million) in compressed natural gas (CNG) as a replacement for gasoline and diesel as a transport fuel.

== Government financing needs ==
According to the first Biennial Update Report (BUR) submitted to the UNFCCC in 2021, the most important funding needs included US$2,000,000 to build a wind atlas for the country (in order to assess the country's wind energy potential), US$930,000 to sustain greenhouse gas emission data collection, US$500,000 to identify sites for carbon capture and storage, and US$450,000 to establish a monitoring, reporting and verification and Enhanced Transparency Framework unit within the government.

== Non-governmental role ==
Funding from international donors generally flows through the government of Trinidad and Tobago, making it difficult for grassroots organisations to gain access. Environmentalist Omar Mohammed of the Cropper Foundation described the process of accessing funding through the government as "exceedingly complex", while Akilah Jaramogi of the Fondes Amandes Community Reafforestation Project stressed the importance of providing grants, not loans, to civil society groups, which lack the ability to repay loans.

ANSA Merchant Bank, the Cropper Foundation and the Netherlands-based Capitals Coalition formed the Caribbean Natural Capital Hub in 2022 to provide loans and grants to small and medium-sized businesses in the Caribbean as well as to support environmental sustainability and climate change mitigation.

== Responses ==
Trinidad and Tobago economist Jwala Rambarran pointed out the inequity involved in financing climate change adaptation and mitigation through "high cost loans from rich countries" which further contribute to the debt burden of Caribbean nations. Despite making promises to contribute $100 billion US a year, Rambarran said "the rich industrialised countries have not kept their climate promise".

Trinidad and Tobago 0.09% of global emissions, and the remainder of the region contributes far less. This, according to Rambarran, has result in a situation where "Caribbean countries are disproportionately and tragically affected by the climate crisis which they did not create".

== See also ==
- Climate change in the Caribbean
- Climate finance in Jamaica
