= Carib Brewery =

Brewery in Trinidad and Tobago

Carib Brewery Limited
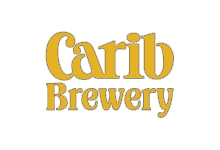

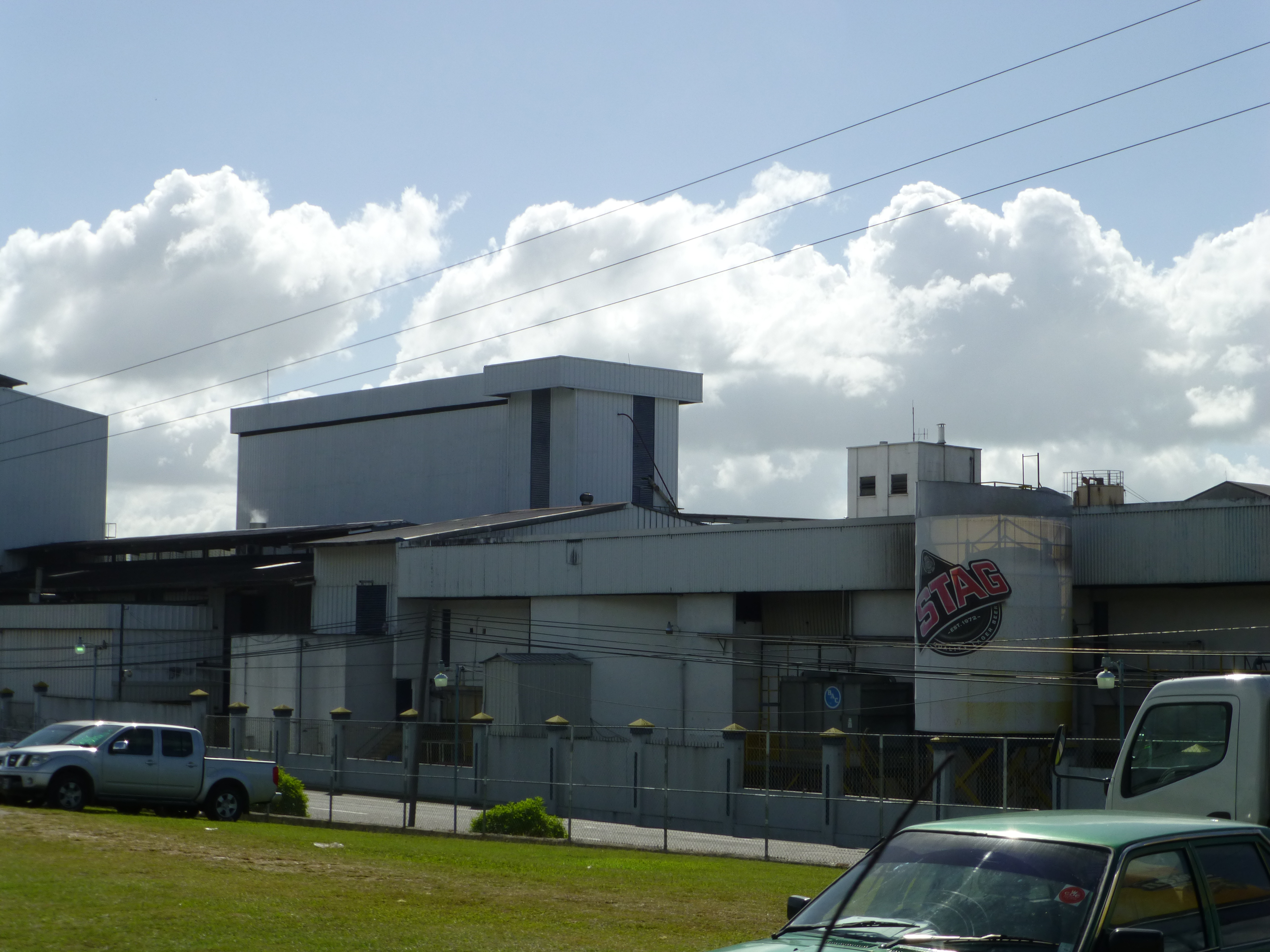
- Carib brewery, Champs Fleurs
- Location: Champs Fleurs, San Juan-Laventille, Trinidad and Tobago
- Coordinates: 10.649286°N 61.428624°W
- Opened: 1947
- Key people: Anthony "AS3" Sabga III
- Other products: shandies, malt beer, ciders
- Owned by: ANSA McAL
- Website: www.caribbrewery.com

Active beers
Name	Type
Carib	lager
Stag	lager

The Carib Brewery Limited is headquartered in Trinidad and Tobago. It produces Carib and Stag beers and a range of shandy products. The main brewery is located in Champs Fleurs, Trinidad, while Carib also has breweries in Saint Kitts and Nevis and Grenada, as well as a United States affiliate brewery in Cape Canaveral, Florida.

The brewery is owned by the ANSA McAL Group of Companies.

== History ==
In order to reduce Trinidad's dependency on the cultivation of sugar and oil, in 1947 the Caribbean Development Company Limited (CDC) was founded. In September 1950 the first Trinidadian beer, Carib lager, was brought to market. The brand is still available, is being sold throughout large parts of the Caribbean and is market leader in Trinidad. In 1955 CDC was split into Carib Brewery Ltd. (starting with seven employees) and Carib Glassworks Ltd. Through acquisitions Carib attained a monopoly on beer production in Trinidad in 1957.

In the 1970s Carib expanded and raised its production to 250,000 hectolitres per year. 1973 the company launched its first non-alcoholic beverage, Malta Carib, a malt beer. In 1985 this was followed up with Shandy Carib, the company's first shandy. In 1987 the equipment was modernised by renowned German manufacturer Steinecker Maschinenfabrik so that the output mark of 1.000.000 hectolitres was surpassed. In the subsequent time the company's beverage business was internationalised. On the one hand distribution and licence contracts with foreign producers such as Diageo or InBev were concluded, on the other hand Carib started to export its own brands. Production sites outside Trinidad were founded: Carib Brewery St. Kitts and Nevis exists since 1997, Carib Brewery Grenada since 2002. In 2015 another shandy was launched, Carib Radler.

In 2016 ANSA McAL bought American brewery Florida Beer Company located in Cape Canaveral. At first Florida Beer was continued as an individual brand, but in June 2021 it was discontinued. Since then the Carib Brewery brands and a craft beer called Hurricane Reef are being brewed in the Cape Canaveral facilities. In late 2024 the company expanded to India, created a joint venture with local distillery Globus SPirits and started the production of beer for the Indian market.

== Products ==
=== Beers ===
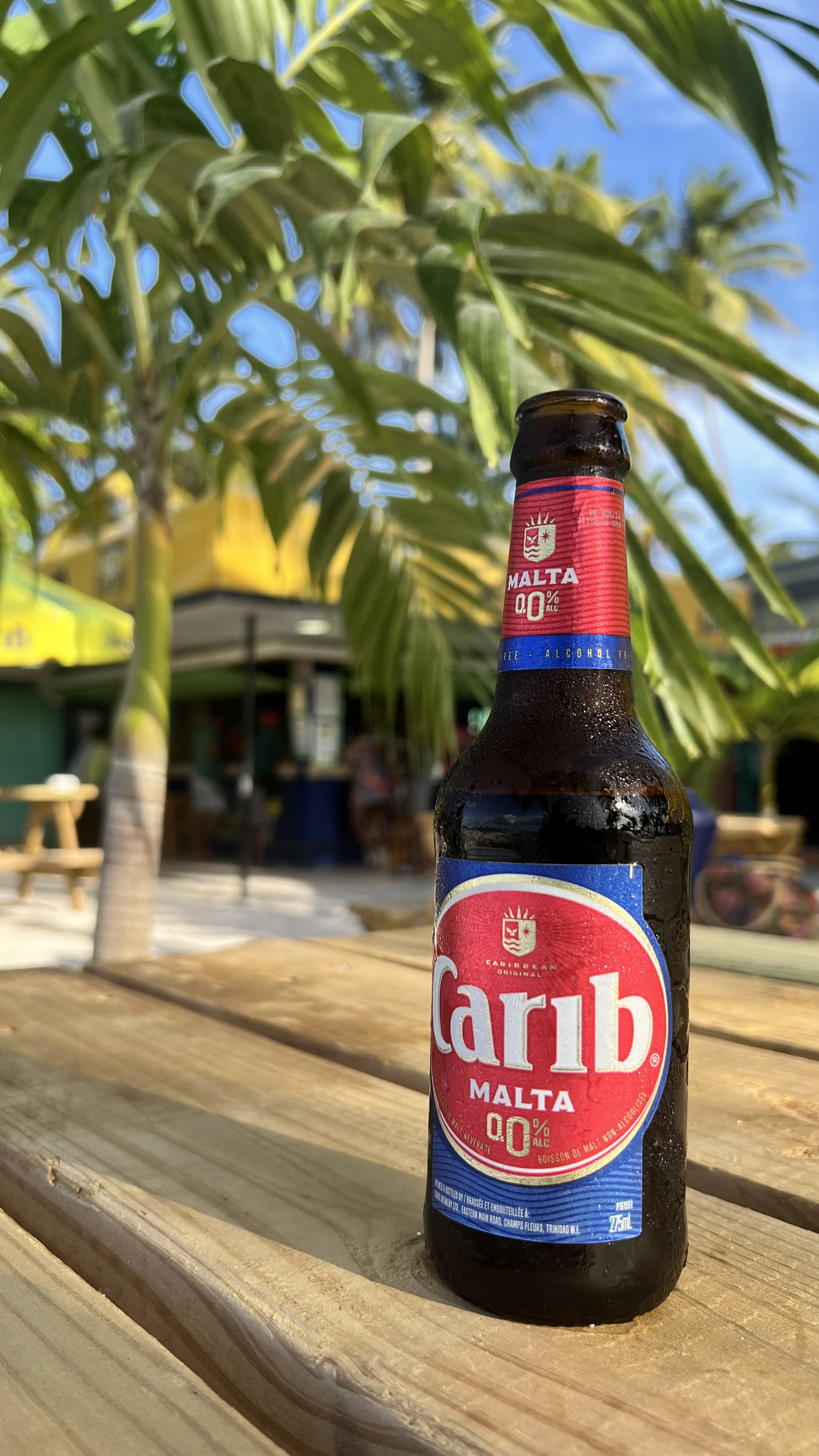
Non-alcoholic Carib Malta beer bottle

- Carib, a lager beer with 5.0% abv. Silver medal in the "low-alcohol lager" category at the World Beer Cup 2000.
- Carib Pilsner Light, a pilsner with 4% abv.
- Guinness Foreign Extra Stout, a strong beer with 7.5% abv, bottling agreement with Diageo.
- Heineken, a lager beer with 5% abv, bottling agreement with Heineken.
- Heineken 0.0, a non-alcoholic beer, bottling agreement with Heineken.
- Heineken Light, a light beer with 3.3% abv, bottling agreement with Heineken.
- Hurricane Reef, an IPA with 6.5% abv, brewed by Carib USA.
- Mackeson Triple Stout, a sweet stout with 4.9% abv, bottling agreement with InBev.
- Malta Carib, a malt beer.
- Pola Beer, a lager beer with 5% abv.
- Royal Extra Stout, a strong beer with 6.6% abv with added caramel.
- Shandy Carib, a shandy in four flavours (lime, ginger, tangerine and sorrel).
- Smalta, a malt beer.
- Stag, a lager beer with 5.2% abv. Gold medal in the "low-alcohol lager" category at the World Beer Cup 2000.

=== Other beverages ===
- Caribe, a cider with flavours Brut, Mimosa, Pearsecco and Rosé.
- Ginseng Up, a soda with ginseng extractives and fruit flavour. Flavours: Original, Lemon Lime and Kola Champagne.
- Rockstone Tonic Wine, a tonic wine.
- Smirnoff Ice, a vodka-based mixed drink, bottling agreement with Diageo.

=== Former products ===
- Carib Radler, a radler with 2% abv, that is occasionally produced seasonally.
