= Trenton Allen =

- Born: United States
- Education: Harvard University
- Occupation: Banker
- Known for: Financier focused on sustainability projects

Trenton Allen is an American investment banker focused on sustainable projects and a member of the Secretary of Energy Advisory Board for the U.S. Department of Energy. He is the CEO and Managing Director of Sustainable Capital Advisors (SCA). Allen led one of the first "green bond" issuances with an Energy Efficiency Revenue Bond financing the Delaware Sustainable Energy Utility.

== Education ==
Allen earned an AB degree in chemistry from Harvard University.

== Career ==
Allen founded Sustainable Capital Advisors in 2012. Prior to founding SCA, Allen was a Director at Citigroup where he focused on financing large infrastructure investments.

SCA is an investment advisory firm specializing in the finance of sustainable infrastructure projects, including distributed solar, multi-family energy efficiency, climate resiliency infrastructure finance, and municipal green financing authorities. SCA also consults with community leaders and local governments to help them successfully structure proposals for green infrastructure projects.

In 2021, Allen became a member of the Secretary of Energy Advisory Board for the U.S. Department of Energy.

Allen serves on multiple nonprofit boards, including CleanEnergyWorks and IREC. Allen and SCA have worked with organizations including Groundswell, the Community Builders of Color Coalition, and Justice 40.
