= Climate finance in Jamaica =

The mobilization of capital to invest in climate solutions in Jamaica takes many forms, including through bank and credit union products, the capital markets, public spending, and venture capital/private equity. Jamaica's GDP in 2022 was over $17 billion USD, translating to a GDP per capita of $6,234 USD.

== Energy context ==
As of 2025, over 90% of Jamaica's energy supply comes from fossil fuels: 69% from oil, 20% from natural gas, and 2% from coal. The electrical grid capacity stands at 1.2 GW, and renewable energy only accounts for 254 MW of the installed capacity. Jamaica's electric utility rates are higher than average when compared to other Caribbean nations, and stand as follow: $US 0.307/kWh for residential customers and $US 0.248/kWh for commercial customers. These rates are driven by two primary factors: fossil fuel costs (about 44%) and JPS's profit (about 30%). Jamaica Public Service Limited (JPS) is 80% owned by the Marubeni Corporation of Japan and Korea East-West Power (EWP).

== Private climate finance ==
There are 25 credit unions with total assets under management (AUM) of about $US 1 billion and over 1 million members in Jamaica. There are eleven non-credit union depository institutions, including eight commercial banks, two building societies, and one merchant bank that have a total of $US 2.5 billion. The country's capital reserves are around $US 4.5 billion. Bank and credit union loan products include home equity loans, cash-secured loans, share-secured loans (credit union), personal unsecured loans, and renewable energy loans.

Jamaica's renewable energy developers include Soleco Energy (which started as the sister company of Rekamniar Frontier Ventures), which commissioned the Paradise Park Solar Project in 2019, providing the lowest cost of electricity in Jamaica with an installed capacity of 51.5 MW. Investors in Soleco Energy include Rubis, a French oil and gas company with operations in Africa, the Caribbean, and Europe.

The Jamaican Stock Exchange (JSE), the oldest incorporated stock exchange in the Caribbean with a market capitalization of over $US 12 billion, hosts four submarkets: a main market, a USD market, a junior market, a bond market, and a private market. JSE has historically been a high-performing stock market, and in 2019 was the world's best-performing market. Several climate solutions companies are listed, including Wigton Windfarm Limited (JMSE: WIG), Fosrich (JMSE: FOSRICH), and MPC Clean Energy (MPCCEL).

The Sagicor Renewable Energy Fund is a Barbados-based fund that invests about 14% of assets into Caribbean projects.

Managed by Mscale LLC (“Mscale”), a U.S. Delaware-based company focused on venture and capital advisory, a new (as of 2024) venture capital fund has been established to invest in Jamaica's tourism, sports, retail, digital health, renewable energy, mobility, fintech, e-commerce, agritech, logistics, and business services sectors. The Development Bank of Jamaica (DBJ) has invested $US 4.9 million into this venture capital fund with a target fund size of $US 50 million.

== Public climate finance ==
In 2021, the Government of Jamaica was the first in the world to issue a climate catastrophe bond, which provided the government with $US 185 million in storm protection. The bond was supported by the Global Risk Financing Facility (GRiF), USAID, and the World Bank.

The Development Bank of Jamaica (DBJ) funds for-profit businesses through innovation grants, supply chain grants, loans, and private equity for small and medium-sized enterprises (SMEs).

== Incentivizing climate-friendly investment ==
The Jamaican government has established several incentives for climate finance. These include the following:

- A net billing program whereby energy exported to the grid receives compensation.
- The common external tariff ranges from 10-20% on goods and is suspended for renewable energy and energy efficient items and appliances.
- Duties on electric vehicle imports decreased from 30% to 10%.
- The general consumption tax of 15% is suspended for lithium batteries, solar panels, inverters, wind turbines, and support accessories.
- There is an income tax credit equivalent to 30% of the purchase cost of a residential solar PV system, up to a maximum of JMD $4,000,000.
- The import tax is suspended for solar panels, inverters, wind turbines, and support accessories.
- There is 25-30% income tax relief for large-scale renewable projects valued at $US 1 billion and more.

== See also ==
- Climate finance
- Climate change in Jamaica
- Climate change in the Caribbean
- Climate finance in Trinidad and Tobago
