= Sustainability Bonds =

Sustainability Bonds are fixed-income financial instruments (bonds) where the proceeds will be exclusively used to finance or re-finance a combination of Green and Social Projects and which are aligned with the four core components of the International Capital Market Association (ICMA) Green Bonds Principles and Social Bonds principles.

The main difference among green, social and sustainability bonds, lies in their sustainable categories for the allocation of proceeds, sustainability bonds needing to combine both social and green categories.

== The principles ==
ICMA principles are currently the most commonly accepted framework for green, social and sustainability bonds’ issuance. They are coordinated by ICMA, which provides not only administrative support but also guidance for their governance process. The four core components of the principles from ICMA includes: Use of proceeds, where one should identify the set of green and social sustainable categories or list of projects and assets to be financed by the proceeds from the bond issuance; Process for project evaluation and selection, which is the process for selecting and evaluating eligible green and social projects using selection criteria identified by the issuer; Management of proceeds, which is the ability to define the process for tracking, allocating and spending the proceeds of the bond; and finally, Reporting, which determines ‘what’ and ‘how often’ issuers have to disclose information to investors.

The proceeds of sustainability bonds need to be applied in both the Green project and Social project categories.

Green project categories suggested by the principles (ICMA) include energy, buildings, transport, water management, waste management & pollution control, nature-based assets including land use, agriculture and forestry, industry & energy-intensive commercial, and information technology & communications.

Social Project categories suggested by the principles (ICMA) include affordable basic infrastructure, access to essential services, affordable housing, employment, food security and sustainable food systems, and socioeconomic advancement and empowerment.

Other international standards and frameworks examples are the International Climate Bonds Standards and the ASEAN standards.

== Criticism and controversies ==
Several authors and studies have raised concerns about the risk of greenwashing, when revenues are not systematically applied to activities with positive environmental outcomes. Further indicating that this risk is accentuated by the lack of a clear and unique definition of what makes a bond "sustainable".

The same argument could be said for sustainability bonds as well. The bonds could serve finance projects that in reality don't have any impact at all on the environment and society; the behavior being explained by the increasing external pressure to engage in sustainability initiatives.

Another criticism is that most of the public and private sector players are more still concerned about the revenue-generating aspects and mainly using the ‘sustainability’ label as a competitive advantage in the business

A new category of bonds known as sustainability-linked bonds (SLB), tries to overcome these problems by penalizing the issuer with a step-up coupon in case of failing its sustainability performance target(s).

== Differences in bonds ==
Distinctions between the three types of bonds ( green, social, and sustainability bonds) comes from the taxonomies provided by some of the main exchanges on the sustainable global debt capital markets. The London Stock Exchange provides criterion for its "three separate dedicated segments". NASDAQ also developed several bond segments within it Sustainable Debt Market.

For social and sustainability bonds, defining the target population stands as listing requirements among the use of proceeds criteria. The Luxembourg Stock Exchange developed a sustainable finance platform (LuxSE) where it publishes a defined classification of bonds, endorsed by various recognized standards, taxonomies, frameworks and labels which work closely with ICMA and other taxonomies .

== See also ==
- Environmental finance
- Bond (finance)
- Climate bond
- Sustainability-linked bond
