= Sustainability-linked bond =

Bond tied to ESG objectives

A Sustainability-linked bond (SLB) is a fixed income instrument (Bond) where its financial and/or structural characteristics are tied to predefined Sustainability/ESG objectives. The objectives are measured through predefined Key Performance Indicators (KPIs) and evaluated against predefined Sustainability Performance Targets (SPTs).

The proceeds of SLBs are intended for general purposes, and the use of proceeds is not determinative in their categorization. Bonds where the proceeds are used to finance or re-finance green projects, social projects or a combination of both are called Green, social and Sustainability bonds respectively, and should not be confused with SLBs.

== Sustainability-Linked Bond Principles ==
The Sustainability-Linked Bond Principles are voluntary process guidelines that provide best practices and recommendations for financial instruments to incorporate forward-looking sustainability performance. They are expected to play a key role in the development of the Sustainability-Linked Bond market by enhancing market integrity and consistency and helping mitigate investor fears of ESG-washing. Over 80% of sustainability-linked bonds followed ICMA's SLBP in 2020.

The SLBPs have five core components:

1. Selection of Key Performance Indicators: Selecting KPIs that are relevant, core and material to the issuer's overall business. They should be measurable or quantifiable on a consistent methodological basis, externally verifiable, and able to be benchmarked.
2. Calibration of Sustainability Performance Targets: SPTs must represent a material improvement in the respective KPIs and be beyond a business-as-usual trajectory. Targets must be consistent with the issuers' overall strategic sustainability / ESG strategy; and determined before (or concurrently with) the issuance of the bond on a predefined timeline. An external review is recommended.
3. Bond characteristics: The variation in the financial and/or structural characteristics of the bonds must be proportional and significant in relation to the original financial characteristics of the issuer's bonds.
4. Reporting: Issuers should publish regularly, and at least annually, information on the performance of the selected KPIs, a verification report outlining the performance against the SPTs and any information enabling investors to monitor the level of ambition of the SPTs
5. Verification: Issuers should provide independent, external verification of their level of performance against each SPT for each KPI by a qualified external reviewer with relevant experience.

== History ==
Italian utility Enel issued in September 2019 the first sustainability-linked bond. Enel chose as a target the increase of installed energy capacity to at least 55%. If this target is not met, Enel will pay an annual penalty of 25 basis points on its coupon rate. In December 2020, utility NRG Energy became the first company in North America to issue an SLB and in February 2021 UltraTech Cement became the first Indian issuer to tap the market. Other recent SLB issuers include United Arab Emirates airline operator Etihad Airways, Brazilian paper and pulp firm Suzano, French payment solutions-provider Edenred, and Swiss pharmaceutical company Novartis.

== SLB 2019-2020 statistics ==
SLB issuance in 2020 was around $10.6 billion and $5 billion in 2019. By 2021 JP Morgan expects the SLB market to grow strongly to $150 billion, a 13-fold increase.

In 2020, the majority of SLB were linked to achievement of a single KPI, with about 60% of issued SLB. Over 85% of SLBs were linked to environmental KPI with reducing greenhouse gas emissions being the most common type of KPI. A 25 basis point coupon step-up were the most common debt pricing adjustment with almost 40% of issued SLB.

== See also ==
- Environmental finance
- Bond (finance)
- Green Bonds
- Social impact bond
