= ANSA Merchant Bank =

Merchant bank in Trinidad and Tobago

- Trade name: AMBL
- Formerly: ANSA Finance & Merchant Bank
- Traded as: TTSE: AMBL
- Founded: 1997
- Headquarters: Trinidad and Tobago
- Key people: A. Norman Sabga (chairman)

ANSA Merchant Bank Limited, established in 1997 as ANSA Finance & Merchant Bank, is a merchant bank located in Trinidad and Tobago. It is a subsidiary of the ANSA McAL group and provides services including auto financing, asset finance, investment services, and merchant banking. Other subsidiaries include Tatil (general insurance) and Tatil Life (life insurance).

== History ==
In 1997, ANSA Finance & Merchant Bank was listed on the stock exchange.

In December 2020, ANSA Merchant Bank Limited purchased the Trinidad and Tobago locations of the Indian Bank of Baroda.

In February 2021, AMBL completed the acquisition of an international bank. Following this, it launched ANSA Bank Ltd, where Hill also held a director position.

In April 2021, these acquired branches were rebranded as ANSA Bank branches, the bank branch subsidiary of ANSA Merchant Bank.
