= Green Climate Fund =

Fund helping developing countries to counter climate change

- Abbreviation: GCF
- Formation: 2010; 16 years ago
- Legal status: Active
- Headquarters: Songdo, Yeonsu District, Incheon, South Korea
- Website: GreenClimate.fund

The Green Climate Fund (GCF) is a fund for climate finance that was established within the framework of the United Nations Framework Convention on Climate Change (UNFCCC). Considered the world's largest fund of its kind, GCF's objective is to assist developing countries with climate change adaptation and mitigation activities. The GCF is an operating entity of the financial mechanism of the UNFCCC. It is based in Songdo, Incheon, South Korea and governed by a board of 24 members and supported by a Secretariat.

Mafalda Duarte, a Portuguese development economist, is the fund's executive director.

The GCF supports projects and other activities in developing countries using thematic funding windows. There are four other, smaller multilateral climate funds for paying out money in climate finance which are coordinated by the UNFCCC. These include the Adaptation Fund (AF), the Least Developed Countries Fund (LDCF), the Special Climate Change Fund (SCCF) and the Global Environment Facility (GEF). The GCF is the largest of these five funds.

As of November 2026, the GCF had a portfolio of over $22.3 billion USD (over $87.1 billion USD including co-financing).

The process of designing the GCF has raised several issues. These include ongoing questions on how funds will be raised, the role of the private sector, the level of "country ownership" of resources, and the transparency of the Board itself. Also, this additional international climate institution might further fragment taxpayer's money that is put towards climate action.

The GCF's former director Héla Cheikhrouhou complained in 2016 that the fund was backing too many "business-as-usual types of investment proposals".

In 2023, the executive director announced a series of reforms aimed at making the fund more efficient and positioned to deliver greater impact.

== History ==
Wealthier, industrialized countries have been responsible for most greenhouse gas emissions. As a consequence, it has been argued that these countries are morally responsible to pay for the majority of the cost of climate mitigation worldwide, including costs of the transition of less developed and least developed countries. A number of civil society groups determined that the United States and the European Union should be responsible for at least 54% of the cost of mitigating climate change-driven disaster damage in the Global South. Others have argued that wealthier countries should help finance the transition of less developed and least developed countries because the former can more realistically afford the substantial investment now urgently needed for the transition.

The Copenhagen Accord, established during the 2009 United Nations Climate Change Conference (COP-15) in Copenhagen mentioned the "Copenhagen Green Climate Fund". The fund was formally established during the 2010 United Nations Climate Change Conference in Cancun as a fund within the UNFCCC framework. Its governing instrument was adopted at the 2011 United Nations Climate Change Conference (COP 17) in Durban, South Africa.

== Procedures ==
During COP-16 in Cancun, Mexico, governance of GCF was moved to the newly-founded Green Climate Fund Board, and the World Bank was chosen as the temporary trustee. To develop a design for the functioning of the GCF, the "Transitional Committee for the Green Climate Fund" was established. The committee met four times throughout the year 2011 and submitted a report to the 17th COP in Durban, South Africa. Based on this report, the COP decided that the "GCF would become an operating entity of the financial mechanism" of the UNFCCC, and that on COP-18 in 2012, the necessary rules should be adopted to ensure that the GCF "is accountable to and functions under the guidance of the COP". Researchers at the Overseas Development Institute state that without this last minute agreement on a governing instrument for the GCF, the "African COP" would have been considered a failure. Since then developing countries (like South Africa) have embarked on integrated planning and infrastructure prioritization to avoid lock in to unstainable development pathways and work towards a just transition to "greener" economy.

Furthermore, the GCF board was tasked with developing rules and procedures for the disbursement of funds, ensuring that these should be consistent with the national objectives of the countries where projects and programmes will be taking place. The GCF Board was also charged with establishing an independent secretariat and the permanent trustee of the GCF.

The fund partners with 84 organizations that include commercial and development banks, state agencies and civil society groups, which pilot and execute innovative approaches to climate programs.

There are other multilateral climate funds (i.e. governed by multiple national governments) which are important for paying out money in climate finance. As of 2022, there are five multilateral climate funds coordinated by the UNFCCC. These are the Green Climate Fund (GCF), the Adaptation Fund (AF), the Least Developed Countries Fund (LDCF), the Special Climate Change Fund (SCCF) and the Global Environment Facility (GEF). The GCF is the largest of these five funds.

== Sources of finance ==
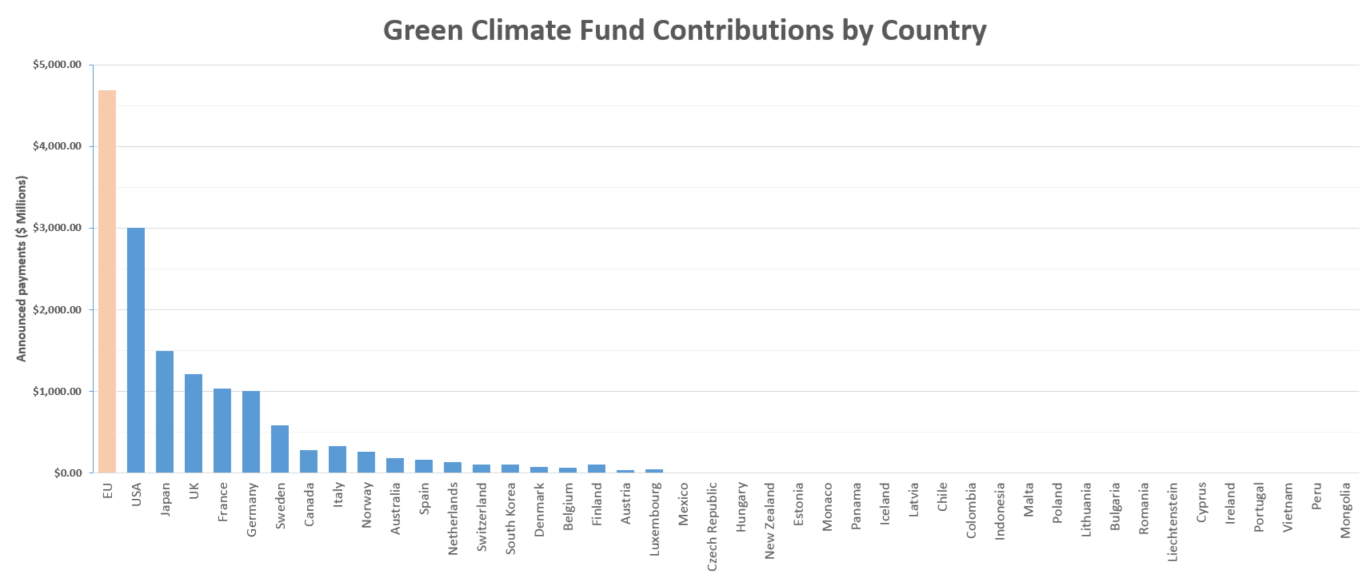
Paris Climate Agreement contributions by country (or region in the case of the European Union, which is the bar at the left)

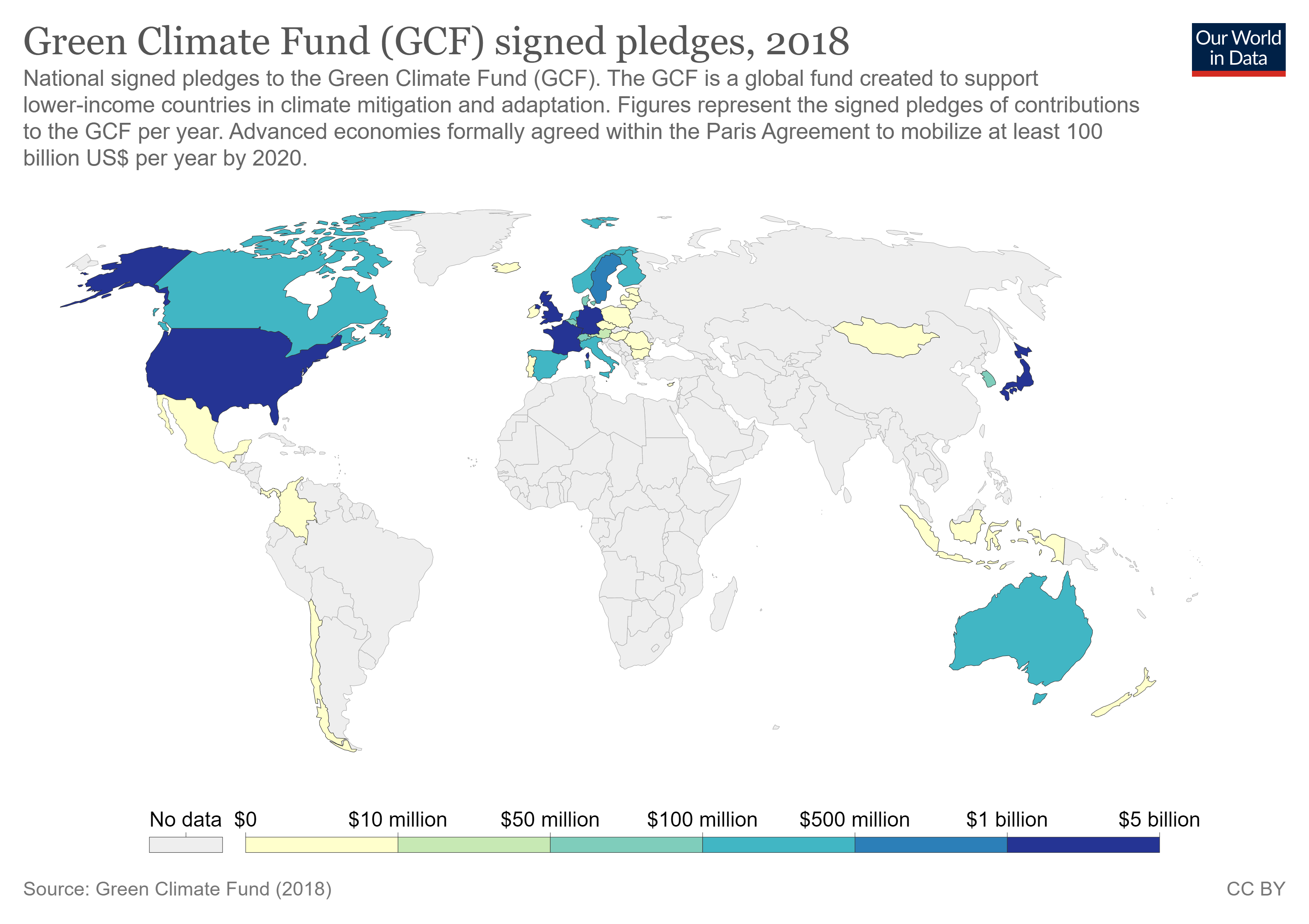
World map for Sustainable Development Goal 13 Indicator 13.A.1: Green Climate Fund mobilization of $100 billion, 2018

Countries agreed to mobilise $100 billion a year by 2020 in climate finance, some of which has been mobilised through the GCF. Uncertainty over where this money would come from led to the creation of a High Level Advisory Group on Climate Financing (AGF) by UN Secretary-General Ban Ki-moon in February 2010. There is no formal connection between AGF and GCF, although its report is one source for debates on "resource mobilisation" for the GCF, an item that will be discussed at the GCF October 2013 Board meeting. Disputes also remain as to whether the funding target will be based on public sources, or whether "leveraged" private finance will be counted towards the total.

As of February 2020, a total of US$10.3 billion was pledged and US$8.24 billion confirmed, as part of the Initial Resource Mobilization (IRM) period. As of Dec 2023, the GCF had a portfolio of 13.5 billion USD (51.9 billion USD including co-financing).

The lack of pledged funds and potential reliance on the private sector is controversial and has been criticized by developing countries.

U.S. President Obama committed the US to contributing US$3 billion to the fund. In January 2017, in his final three days in office, Obama initiated the transfer of a second $500m installment to the fund, leaving $2 billion owing. Former U.S. President Donald Trump in his announcement of U.S. withdrawal from the Paris Agreement on 1 June 2017, also criticized the Green Climate Fund, calling it a scheme to redistribute wealth from rich to poor countries.

Green Climate Fund Financial Contribution by Country
Country	Announced ($Millions)	Signed ($Millions)	Signed per capita	GDP per capita	Emissions per capita (tonnes of CO_{2}e)
(United States) USA	$3,000	$3,000	$9.41	$55,000	17
Japan	$1,500	$1,500	$11.80	$36,000	9
(United Kingdom) UK	$1,211	$1,211	$18.77	$46,000	7
France	$1,035	$1,035	$15.64	$43,000	5
Germany	$1,003	$1,003	$12.40	$48,000	9
Sweden	$581	$581	$59.31	$59,000	6
Canada	$277	$277	$7.79	$50,000	14
Italy	$334	$268	$4.54	$35,000	7
Norway	$258	$258	$50.20	$97,000	9
Australia	$187	$187	$7.92	$62,000	17
Spain	$161	$161	$3.46	$30,000	6
Netherlands	$134	$134	$7.94	$52,000	10
Switzerland	$100	$100	$12.21	$85,000	5
South Korea	$100	$100	$1.99	$28,000	12
Denmark	$71.8	$71.8	$12.73	$61,000	7
Belgium	$66.9	$66.9	$6.18	$48,000	9
Finland	$107	$46.4	$8.49	$50,000	10
Austria	$34.8	$34.8	$4.09	$51,000	8
Luxembourg	$46.8	$33.4	$58.63	$111,000	21
Mexico	$10.0	$10.0	$0.08	$10,000	4
Czech Republic	$5.32	$5.32	$0.57	$20,000	10
Hungary	$4.30	$4.30	$0.43	$14,000	5
New Zealand	$2.56	$2.56	$0.57	$42,000	7
Estonia	$1.30	$1.30	$0.99	$20,000	14
Monaco	$1.08	$1.08	$28.89	$163,000	–
Panama	$1.00	$1.00	$0.25	$12,000	3
Iceland	$1.00	$0.50	$1.55	$52,000	6
Latvia	$0.47	$0.47	$0.24	$16,000	4
Chile	$0.30	$0.30	$0.02	$15,000	5
Colombia	$6.00	$0.30	< $0.01	$8,000	2
Indonesia	$0.25	$0.25	< $0.01	$4,000	2
Malta	$0.20	$0.20	$0.47	$23,000	6
Poland	$0.11	$0.11	< $0.01	$14,000	8
Lithuania	$0.10	$0.10	$0.04	$16,000	5
Bulgaria	$0.10	$0.10	$0.02	$8,000	7
Romania	$0.10	$0.10	< $0.01	$10,000	4
Liechtenstein	< $0.1	< $0.1	$1.48	$135,000	1
Cyprus	$0.50	–	0	$27,000	7
(Republic of Ireland) Ireland	$2.70	–	0	$53,000	8
Vietnam	$0.10	–	0	$2,000	2
Portugal	$2.68	–	0	$22,000	5
Peru	$6.00	–	0	$7,000	2
Mongolia	< $0.1	–	0	$4,000	7

== Beneficiary countries ==
Country	Number of projects (as of July 2023)	Total GCF Financing ($ million, as of July 2023)
Ghana	7	103.7
Afghanistan	1	17.2
Albania	4	29.1
Antigua and Barbuda	2	39.4
Argentina	4	208.7
Armenia	5	117.1
Azerbaijan	4	-
Bahamas	4	31.2
Bahrain	1	2.3
Bangladesh	7	374.0
Barbados	3	87.0
Belize	2	12.0
Benin	8	66.6
Bhutan	2	51.9
Bolivia	1	33.3
Bosnia and Herzegovina	1	17.3

== Issues ==
The process of designing the GCF has raised several issues. These include ongoing questions on how funds will be raised, the role of the private sector, the level of "country ownership" of resources, and the transparency of the Board itself. In addition, questions have been raised about the need for yet another new international climate institution which may further fragment public dollars that are put toward mitigation and adaptation annually.

The Fund's initial investments have met with mixed responses. But in at least one case it also drew praise for involving local communities in the formulation of an adaptation project, and for incorporating consumer protection into a plan for off-grid solar energy.

=== Role of the private sector ===
One of the most controversial aspects of the GCF concerns the creation of the Fund's Private Sector Facility (PSF). Many of the developed countries represented on the GCF board advocate a PSF that appeals to capital markets, in particular the pension funds and other institutional investors that control trillions of dollars that pass through Wall Street and other financial centers. They hope that the Fund will ultimately use a broad range of financial instruments.

However, several developing countries and non-governmental organizations have suggested that the PSF should focus on "pro-poor climate finance" that addresses the difficulties faced by micro-, small-, and medium-sized enterprises in developing countries. This emphasis on encouraging the domestic private sector is also written into the GCF's Governing Instrument, its founding document.

=== Additionality of funds ===
The Cancun agreements clearly specify that the funds provided to the developing countries as climate finance, including through the GCF, should be "new" and "additional" to existing development aid. The condition of funds having to be new means that pledges should come on top of those made in previous years. As far as additionality is concerned, there is no strict definition of this term, which has already led to serious problems in evaluating the additionality of emission reductions through CDM projects, leading to counter-productivity, and even fraud. While climate finance usually only counts pledges from developed countries, the US$10.3 billion pledged to the GCF also includes some (relatively small) contributions from developing countries.

=== Failure to ban fossil fuel funding and business as usual ===
At its board meeting in South Korea held in March 2015, the GCF refused an explicit ban on fossil fuel projects, effectively allowing for the funding of coal plants. Japan, China, and Saudi Arabia opposed the ban.

The Fund's former director Héla Cheikhrouhou has complained that the Fund is backing too many "business-as-usual types of investment proposals", a view echoed by a number of civil society organizations.

=== Balance between mitigation and adaptation ===
The Fund is also pledged to offer "balanced" support to adaptation and mitigation, although there is some concern amongst developing countries that inadequate adaptation financing will be offered, in particular if the fund is reliant on "leveraging" private sector finance. While GCF governing instrument stresses on the need for equal funding towards adaptation and mitigation, there is no universal measure of adaptation, which makes access to GCF funding extremely cumbersome.
