= ANSA McAL =

Trinidad and Tobago conglomerate

- Trade name: AMCL
- Formerly: Alston & Co. Limited
- Type: Public
- Traded as: TTSE: AMCL
- Founded: 1881
- Headquarters: Trinidad and Tobago

ANSA McAL Limited is one of Trinidad and Tobago's largest conglomerates, owned by the Syrian Sabga family, with several diversified companies in the Caribbean, Europe and North America. It is traded on the Trinidad and Tobago Stock Exchange as AMCL.

== Early history ==
In 1881, George R. Alston established Geo. R. Alston & Co, a company that specialized in buying and exporting of cocoa. In 1890, Alston left Trinidad and Tobago and initiated a partnership deal with McGregor Frame (Frame Alston & Co). Frame Alston & Co then succeeded by Alston Arbuthnot & Co were the London agents of the Trinidad company until the death of Alston in 1918. In 1904, a saw mill and a lumber and hardware store was launched. During that period, Alston & co. advertised its locations in the Port of Spain and was an agent for seven companies.

In 1914, the company Alston & co expanded its export and import business to also include ship chandlery, cargo handling and being an agent for steamships lines. During that year, steamships were still using coal to power the ships, Geo. R. Alston & Co acquired the Trinidad Coaling Company and supplied coal to companies that owned steamships. Alston & co between 1914 and 1920 handled exporting of cocoa and sugar from the Port of Spain.

In 1921, Geo. R. Alston & Co was incorporated as a Limited liability company (LLC) becoming Alston and Company Limited. Between 1926 and 1928 Roy Alston, Wilfred Alston and Gerald Wight were appointed Directors. Alston & Company by agreement in 1935 with C. Tennant Sons took over trading operations in San Fernando.

On January 1, 1948, Alston & co-founded a sales agency department to give adequate facilities for the distribution of different manufactured goods produced by Alston & co-manufacturing subsidiaries. In that time Sir Erol dos Santos had just retired from colonial service of Trinidad and Tobago, and was invited to join the board of Alston & Co Limited. Erol Santos was at his time of service a financial secretary. In 1957, Alston & Co decided to withdraw from the wholesale provision business and to shut down then handover the electrical department to General Electric company. In 1959, ANSA Barbados was established. Early 1963 Trinidad and Tobago Insurance Limited (TATIL) was established at the Port of Spain, handling fire, marine, motor and accident insurance. Five years later several companies were merged to become Alston Marketing Co. Limited (AMCO). The McEnearney Business Machines Limited was formed from the business machine department of Charles McEnearney & Co. Limited in which in 1969 a four takeover bid ended in the merger of Alston and McEnearney. In 1971, the shipping and travel departments of which were the last remaining trading subsidiaries of Alston Limited were changed into a wholly owned Limited liability company, Alston Shipping and Travels Limited.

=== Tatil Building ===
The Tatil Building
- Interactive map of the The Tatil Building area

General information
- Location: 11 Maraval Road, Port of Spain, Trinidad and Tobago
- Coordinates: 10°39′56.0″N 61°31′09.5″W
- Opened: 1974
- Owner: ANSA McAL

Height
- Height: 45.25 metres (148.5 ft)

Technical details
- Floor count: 12

In 1972, construction began on the landmark Tatil Building in Port of Spain, which was completed in 1974. Tatil Building rises 12 floors above ground and is 45.25 metres (148.5 ft) high. The building houses the Trinidad and Tobago Insurance Limited company. The total construction budget was TT$8.2 million. The building is owned by ANSA McAL.

== Later history ==
In 1972, Alston & Co went ahead to acquire 66.9% of Trinidad's Publishing company, the publishers of Trinidad Guardian. In 1975, Conrad O'Brien was appointed Chairman of Charles McEnearney & Co. Ltd and the following year acquired shares of minority shareholders in the company. Charles McEnearney & Co. Ltd changed its name to McEnearney ALstons Ltd (McAL) which consummated the union of both groups.

After the merge, in 1977 McAL acquired controlling interest and shares in Penta Paints Caribbean Ltd and subsequently in 1978 acquired the entire shareholding of J.T. Allum's Supermarket. In 1980 the premises of the Trinidad Guardian were burnt down. In 1984, Trinidad Guardian resumed operations. In 1986, Angostura Ltd and ABL bid against McAL almost four months after a similar but unsuccessful bid was made by Jessel Securities Ltd. Angostura made an initial offer of $40 Million to McAL and acquired majority of the shares thereby turning McAL to ANSA McAL. In 1987, Anthony Norman Sabga, member of Trinidad’s Syrian community, was appointed Chairman of ANSA McAL.

Classic Motors was formed in early 1992 to be a representative of Honda. That same year, ANSA McAL (US) Inc was founded as a US corporation in Miami serving as the company's worldwide procurement and logistics provider. The Fleming ANSA Merchant bank was established in 1994. In 1998, ANSA McAL also bought the Trinidad Broadcasting Corporation.

Anthony Norman Sabga handed over chairmanship of the company to A. Norman Sabga. In 2004, ANSA Finance and Merchant Bank bought TATIL and TATIL life from ANSA McAL for TT$667million and changed its name to ANSA Merchant Bank Ltd.
