= Green bond =

Bonds used to fund projects which benefit the environment

A green bond is a fixed-income financial instrument (bond) which is used to fund projects that have positive environmental benefits. When referring to climate change mitigation projects they are also known as climate bonds. Green bonds follow the Green Bond Principles stated by the International Capital Market Association (ICMA), and the proceeds from the issuance of which are to be used for the pre-specified types of projects. The categories of eligible green projects include for example: Renewable energy, energy efficiency, pollution prevention and control, environmentally sustainable management of living natural resources and land use, terrestrial and aquatic biodiversity, clean transportation, climate change adaptation.

Like normal bonds, green bonds can be issued by governments, multi-national banks or corporations and the issuing organization repays the bond and any interest. The main difference is that the funds will be used only for positive climate change or environmental projects. This allows investors to target their environmental, social, and corporate governance (ESG) goals by investing in them. They are similar to Sustainability Bonds but sustainability bonds also need to have a positive social outcome.

The growth of bond markets provides increasing opportunities to finance the implementation of the Sustainable Development Goals (SDGs), Nationally Determined Contributions and other green growth projects. A UN conference held on the Sustainable Development Goals in 2021 emphasized the importance of sustainable bonds, and stated that of the approximately €300 trillion of financial assets on the markets, only 1% would be needed to achieve the SDGs.

== Usage ==
=== Green bonds for climate action ===
Green bonds that are issued in order to raise finance for climate change solutions were in the past also called climate bonds. They are used for climate change mitigation or adaptation related projects or programs. These might be greenhouse gas emission reduction projects ranging from sustainable energy to energy efficiency, or climate change adaptation projects ranging from building Nile delta flood defences or helping the Great Barrier Reef adapt to warming waters.

Climate bonds were first proposed in the 2000s, and have grown rapidly since then. As of 2016, the total volume of climate bonds was estimated at 160 billions of dollars; of which 70 billions were issued in 2016. The labelled volume of bonds issued in 2019 was US$255 billion. Climate and green bonds have now been issued by thousands of issuers around the world, including sovereigns, banks and companies of all sizes, and local governments.

Like normal bonds, green bonds can be issued by governments, multi-national banks or corporations. The issuing entity guarantees to repay the bond over a certain period of time, plus either a fixed or variable rate of return.

Most green bonds for climate action are asset-backed, or ringfenced, with investors being promised that all funds raised will only go to specified climate-related programs or assets, such as renewable energy plants or climate mitigation focused funding programs.

The London-based Climate Bonds Initiative provided the world's first certification program for climate bonds. This has been used as a model for various countries to set up their own green bond listing guidelines.

Climate bonds are theme bonds, similar in principle to a railway bond of the 19th century, the war bonds of the early 20th century or the highway bond of the 1960s. Theme bonds are designed to:

- Allow institutional capital - pension, government, insurance and sovereign wealth funds - to invest in areas seen as politically important to their stakeholders that have the same credit risk and returns profile as standards bonds.
- Provide a means for governments to direct funding to climate change mitigation. For example, this might be done by choosing to privilege qualifying bonds with preferential tax treatments.
- Send a political signal to other stakeholders.

Otherwise, for operational purposes, theme bonds largely function as conventional debt instruments. They are risk-weighted and credit rated in the usual way based on the creditworthiness of the issuer, and tradable, market conditions permitting, in international secondary bond markets. These instruments can theoretically be issued at all levels of the fixed income market, from sovereigns to corporate.

=== Role in sustainable finance ===
Green bonds are any type of bond instrument where the proceeds or an equivalent amount is exclusively applied to finance or re-finance, in part or in full, new and/or existing Green Projects. In other words, they are loans issued in the market by a public or private organization to finance environmentally friendly activities. Their growth is consistent; GSS+ (Green, Social and Sustainability bonds and Sustainability-linked bonds) reached a volume of $170 billion in 2018 and $653.5 billion in 2025.

The aim of this type of bond (finance) is to encourage the financing of green projects by attracting more capital to support sustainable development. According to empirical studies, the high demand for this type of bond provides it with a lower yield than its standard equivalent. Scientists recommend including this climate factor in the risk assessment of bonds. The aim is, on the one hand, to increase the borrowing cost of brown bonds which can fund carbon-intensive projects and de-incentivise their investment by increasing the weight of climate risk. On the other hand, the goal is to reduce the weight of risk of green bonds in order to stimulate investment and potentially encourage banks to reduce the interest rate of these bonds.

From a legal point of view, green bonds are not really different from traditional bonds. The promises made to investors are not always included in the contract, and not often in a binding way. Issuers of green bonds usually follow standards and principles set by private-led organisations such as the International Capital Market Association (ICMA)'s Green Bond Principles or the label of the Climate bond initiative. The Paris agreement on climate change highlighted a desire to standardize reporting practices related to green bonds, in order to avoid greenwashing. To date, there are no regulations requiring the borrower to specify its "green" intentions in writing, however, the EU is currently developing a green bond standard which will force issuers to fund activities aligned with the EU taxonomy for sustainable activities. This standard is expected to be a voluntary standard, operating alongside other voluntary standards, with academics and practitioners raising the policymakers' awareness to the dangers of imposing it as a mandatory standard.

The European Union has already created its own "Next Generation EU Green bonds framework" to use green bonds to raise part of the funds for the Next Generation EU project. This project promises an investment of 750 billion euros in grants and loans (at 2018 prices), by the European Commission, aiming to revive the post-COVID-19 economy in the 27 EU member states. Up to 30% of the budget will be raised by issuing green bonds, which results in up to 250 million, and a total of 14.5 million had already been raised by January 2022. This will make the European Commission the largest issuer of green bonds. On 21 December 2024, the European Union Green Bonds Regulation comes into force, allowing the issue of "European Green Bond" (or "EuGB") by companies, regional or local authorities and EEA supra-nationals.

Empirical studies show that the risk of greenwashing is present and may wrongly induce investors to accept lower rates of return than for brown investments. Indeed, theoretical research grounded in Bayesian game theory demonstrates that greenwashing is rational behaviour for value-maximising investors given the insufficiency of a credible regime regulating the use of green labels. The standardization of this taxonomy would reduce the criticism of greenwashing that can be attributed to this type of obligation and enhance clarity and transparency in their use. Rating agencies should focus more on this type of risk in order to identify and quantify it better.

== Benefits ==
The growth of bond markets provides increasing opportunities to finance the implementation of the Sustainable Development Goals (SDGs), Nationally Determined Contributions and other green growth projects. A UN conference held on the Sustainable Development Goals in 2021 emphasized the importance of sustainable bonds, and stated that of the approximately €300 trillion of financial assets on the markets, only 1% would be needed to achieve the SDGs. Green bonds are becoming an increasingly prevalent form of green finance, particularly for clean and sustainable infrastructure development and their large funding needs. They offer a vehicle to both access finance from the capital markets and deliver green impacts that can be verified against standards. In developing countries, green bonds are already financing critical projects, including renewable energy, urban mass transit systems and water supply.

Green bonds mobilised over $93 billion in 2016 to projects and assets with positive environmental impacts. Of total global bond issuance, however, this is still around just 1%.

According to a report by the Climate and Development Knowledge Network and PricewaterhouseCoopers, a green bond market has three key benefits to a country and its environmental goals and commitments. The market increases the finance available for green projects, therefore incentivising an increase in their number. Green bonds mainly finance projects within renewable energy, energy efficiency, low-carbon transport, sustainable water, and waste and pollution. they are viable vehicles for enabling the increasing pool of sustainable investors to access environmental projects. Bonds are an instrument and an approach with which foreign investors are familiar, so these institutions need little new understanding or capacity. Investors are also interested in placing money where the environmental impact achieved is highest per unit of currency, and emerging and developing economies have the potential to offer this where lower project costs exist. The bonds can be a catalyst for further development of the domestic capital market and financial system more broadly beyond environmentally related projects.

== Scale ==
The European Investment Bank issued an equity index-linked bond in 2007, which became the first fixed income product among socially responsible investments. This "Climate Awareness Bond" structure was used to fund renewable energy and energy efficiency projects. Afterwards, The World Bank became first in the world to issue a labelled "green bond" in 2008, which followed a conventional "plain vanilla" bond structure, contrary to the European Investment Bank's equity-linked Climate Awareness Bond.

The green bond market has subsequently increased rapidly in issuance. From 2015 to 2016, the Climate Bonds Initiative reports that there was a 92% increase in green bonds issuance to $92 billion, with different types of issuers starting to issue green bonds. Apple, for example, became the first tech company to issue a green bond in 2016, and Poland became the first sovereign country to issue a green bond at the end of 2016. In 2021, the European Investment Bank was the leading issuer of green and sustainability bonds among multilateral development banks, with sustainability funding reaching €11.5 billion equivalent.

As of at least 2017, China held the largest share (23%) of the green bond market.

The Business and Sustainable Development Commission describes at least US$12 trillion in market opportunities for business from sustainable business models.

The United Nations estimates an annual funding gap of $2.5 trillion is needed for the achievement of the Sustainable Development Goals (SDGs), and of this, US$1 trillion is needed annually for sustainable energy alone. A large number and broad range of projects and assets that contribute to achieving the 17 SDGs need this funding for their development and operations.

One of the SDGs where 'green finance' has been successfully mobilised is on sustainable energy and climate action. The Paris Agreement on climate change entered into force in November 2016, after 196 countries committed to reducing greenhouse gas emissions. Significant quantities of finance are now needed to convert country commitments (Nationally Determined Contributions, NDCs) to implementation and a low-carbon, climate-resilient economy.

Despite recent increases in volumes of climate finance, a significant funding gap will arise unless new sources and channels of finance are mobilised.

Existing international public finance dedicated to climate change is unable to achieve the rapid change required in meeting the finance gap alone. Furthermore, public sector balance sheets do not have the capacity to fund the amounts needed, and so an estimated 80–90% of funding will need to come from the private sector.

Bank balance sheets can take only a proportion of the private finance needed so the capital markets have to be leveraged, along with other sources such as insurance and peer-to-peer.

According to the Climate and Development Knowledge Network, the demand for green bonds has grown quickly on the investor side, with asset owners and managers diversifying their investment portfolios and seeking positive impact beyond financial return. In the light of the global commitment to shift to a green and low-carbon economy, the green bond market has the potential to grow substantially, while attracting more diverse issuers and investors.

Emerging and frontier markets are developing markets, financing facilities, and investment-grade debt and equity products for climate bonds and green investments compared to Western developed economies.

== Criticism and controversies ==
The green bond market has attracted international criticism with some questioning the green credentials of certain bonds. This criticism pertains both to the projects that are funded, as well as the sustainability credentials of the issuers. In May 2017, the Climate Bonds Initiative refused to list a "green" bond issued by Repsol. The bonds proceeds would be allocated to initiatives meant to improve the efficiency of the company's oil and gas production operations. The non-governmental organization argued that even though the projects would reduce CO_{2} emissions, the company's sustainability strategy did not go far enough from an environmental perspective to classify it as green. This criticism was extended to Vigeo Eiris, the company that reviewed the Repsol bond's green credentials. In 2016, Vigeo Eiris was involved in another green bond controversy. They were targeted by Western Sahara Resource Watch, a non-governmental organization backed by a Norwegian trade union, after it reviewed a green bond that would fund the production of solar projects by a Moroccan government agency in the illegally occupied territory of Western Sahara.

More generally, the academic community and market participants have identified the susceptibility of voluntary green-labelling to greenwashing and adverse selection as a function of the perceived lack of regulatory oversight and the inherent, albeit anecdotal, capital arbitrage opportunity presented to some issuers through the green pricing premium, or "greenium".< In the primary market, this premium can exhibit varying spreads, ranging from -85 to +213 basis points, while the secondary market typically observes a more conservative average "greenium" of -1 to -9 basis points.

== Examples ==
=== United States ===
Voters in the City of San Francisco approved a revenue bond authority in 2001, in the form of a city charter amendment (Section 9.107.8) known as the "solar bonds," to finance renewable energy and energy conservation measures on homes, businesses and government buildings. The campaign for solar bonds, Proposition H, was motivated by the need for the city to take meaningful action on climate change. The solar bond authority was being used as part of the city's renewable energy program, administered by the San Francisco Public Utilities Commission CleanPowerSF, a Community Choice Aggregation program. As of 2024, California's municipally-run Community Choice Aggregation programs were the largest issuers of Green Bonds in the United States.

=== United Kingdom ===
In 2020, the UK's first ever local government green bond, for West Berkshire Council, closed after reaching its £1mn target five days early. Announced on Wednesday 14 October 2020, 22% of the funds raised came from West Berkshire residents, who invested an average of £3,500. The Community Municipal Investment attracted 640 investors in total. In September 2021, the UK's inaugural "green gilt" sale drew over £100bn from investors, making it the highest ever for a UK government bond sale.

=== Canada ===
In Canada, The Community Bond, an innovation in social finance that allows benevolent organizations to issues bonds outside of traditional regulatory oversight, is being used as a "Green Bond" by environmental groups like Solarshare to build community owned solar farms, ZooShare to finance a biogas plant, and Hallbar.org as means to finance energy saving home upgrades and LEED certified building construction.

=== European Union ===
In 2022, the European Investment Bank issued EUR 19.9 billion in Climate and Sustainability Awareness Bonds, and increased its climate and sustainability funding portion of overall investment from 21% in 2021 to 45% in 2022. On 21 December 2024, the European Union Green Bonds Regulation comes into force, allowing the issue of "European Green Bond" (or "EuGB") by companies, regional or local authorities and EEA supra-nationals.

== See also ==
- Carbon offsets and credits – Carbon dioxide reduction scheme
- Climate finance – Type of investment in the context of climate action
- Divestment (for social goals) – Reduction of an asset by a business
- Green economy – Economy based on ecological economics
- Green lending – Lending dependent on environmental criteria
- Green money (disambiguation)
- Greenwashing – Misleading environmental marketing claims
- Social impact bond – Bond repaying investment based on social outcomes
