= The Adaptation Fund =

The Adaptation Fund is an international fund that finances projects and programs aimed at helping developing countries to adapt to the harmful effects of climate change. It is set up under the Kyoto Protocol of the United Nations Framework Convention on Climate Change (UNFCCC).

== History ==
The Adaptation Fund was officially launched in 2007, although it was established in 2001 at the 7th session of the Conference of the Parties (COP7) to the UNFCCC in Marrakech, Morocco to finance concrete adaptation projects and programmes that reduce the adverse effects of climate change facing communities, countries, and sectors. It is intended to finance climate adaptation projects and programmes in developing countries that are parties to the Kyoto Protocol.

== Funding mechanism ==
The Adaptation Fund was initiated to be primarily financed by a share of proceeds from clean development mechanism (CDM) project activities and also with funds from other sources. However, the initial modest contribution of 131€ was made by students from Marienschule in Euskirchen, Germany, after a presentation about the climate crisis made to them by Stuart Scott, who had been attending an intercessional meeting of the negotiations. The ongoing share of CDM proceeds amounts to 2% of certified emission reductions (CER) issued for a CDM project activity. As of September 30, 2013, the Fund had accrued US$188.6 million in proceeds from CER sales. As of November 30, 2013, the Fund had US$156 million available to allocate to climate adaptation projects. By early November 2013, the Adaptation Fund Board (AFB) had allocated approximately US$200 million to support climate adaptation in 29 countries. By October 2015, the Adaptation Fund had committed US$331 million in 54 countries. Total contributions in 2022 amount US$1,237.8 million USD with Germany being the largest contributor (US$513.51 million). The fund has been increased over the years but the US has set a goal to get to 100 million US dollars by 2020 so that all countries can freely use the fund."At the Conference of the Parties (COP15) in 2009, developed countries pledged to provide new and additional resources, called the First Start Finance, approaching US$30 billion between 2010 and 2012 and with balanced allocation between mitigation and adaptation. Finally, but not the last, the Green Climate Fund was established in 2010 as part of the United Nations Framework Convention on Climate Change. It set a goal of raising US$100 billion a year by 2020 to deliver equal amounts of funding to mitigation and adaptation in developing countries." As of 2024 the Adaptation Fund has committed over 1 billion U.S dollars to the Fund since 2010.

As the market for carbon credits plunged, other funding sources became more critical for the Adaptation Fund, and include donations from Annex 1 countries. These amounted to US$151 million as of Sept. 30, 2013. In a major fundraising push, the AFB and secretariat surpassed its goal for pledged donations by the end of 2013, with over US$100 million pledged and donated by governments.

The Adaptation Fund is managed by the Adaptation Fund Board (AFB). The secretariat of the Adaptation Fund Board provides research, advisory, administrative, and an array of other services to the Board, and consists of an international staff based in Washington, DC. The World Bank serves as the trustee of the Adaptation Fund. The AFB is composed of 16 members and 16 alternates representing Annex I countries, Non-Annex I countries, Least Developed Countries (LDCs), Small Island Developing States (SIDSs), and regional constituencies. The AFB meets three times per year in Bonn, Germany. The German Parliament has conferred legal capacity to the AFB. The Adaptation fund primarily works with the most vulnerable communities in developing countries. The fund has worked with many communities around the world and has over 43 million beneficiaries.

One unique feature of the Adaptation Fund is its direct access mechanism, which enables accredited national implementing entities (NIEs) and regional implementing agencies (RIEs) in developing countries to directly access climate adaptation financing. The Adaptation Fund has introduced Direct Access and Enhanced Direct Access. The Direct Access and Enhanced Direct Access allows countries access to the fund so that they can develop their local projectsAn article written by Manuamorn states that "Recent literature suggests that direct national access to multilateral climate funds could promote climate change adaptation investment that focuses more on the needs of vulnerable local communities when compared to indirect access through multilateral agencies." A key concept is 'direct access' to the Fund, intended as an alternative to the perceived short comings of the existing funding structures and procedures of other funds and mechanisms" With the open access to the fund smaller populations can have more direct access to the fund and therefore increase the usage of the Adaptation Fund.

== Uses ==
They use the fund in the agricultural section. "Dependence on monsoon rains makes farming operations in India vulnerable to climate change, particularly since nearly half of the country's cereals and 80% of its legumes and minor millets are grown in regions where irrigation is unavailable, 'Annual and perennial crops are being adversely affected due to increasing monsoon variability and increasingly frequent extreme weather events like hail storms'" The crops that India grows are vital around the world and in their cultures. They grow staple crops such as rice and wheat. Climate change is something India is actively fighting and having the adaptation fund is crucial for India to grow its crops in these conditions. India has used the money in the adaptation fund to research new agricultural technology. To help mitigate the effects of climate change, the Indian Council of Agricultural Research has demonstrated new technologies, such as flood-tolerant rice varieties, and social interventions, like community-run seed banks and village level climate-risk management committees. Maheswari hopes that,"With money from the NAFCC, it will be possible to 'scale up' such projects and initiate new ones to"
