= International Capital Market Association =

Global financial trade association

- Abbreviation: ICMA
- Predecessor: International Primary Market Association and the International Securities Market Association
- Formation: 1969; 57 years ago in Zurich
- Type: Nonprofit Trade Association
- Purpose: Advocate for the debt capital market participants
- Locations: Zurich, Switzerland; Additional offices in London, Paris, Hong Kong, Brussels
- Region served: Worldwide, with focus on Europe
- Services: Trade group & Advocacy group
- Website: www.icmagroup.org

The International Capital Market Association (ICMA) is a not-for-profit global trade association, for participants in the cross-border debt capital markets, with offices in Zurich, London, Paris, Brussels and Hong Kong.

ICMA provides industry-driven standards and recommendations. ICMA works with regulatory and governmental authorities, helping to ensure that financial regulation supports stable and efficient capital markets.

Since 2014, ICMA has been providing the Secretariat for the Principles (the Green Bond Principles (GBP), the Social Bond Principles (SBP), the Sustainability Bond Guidelines (SBG) and the Sustainability-Linked Bond Principles (SLBP)) that underpin the global sustainable bond market. Since December 2022, ICMA has also been providing the Secretariat to the voluntary Code of Conduct for ESG Ratings and Data Providers.

Originally established in Zurich under Swiss Law (Zurich) in February 1969 as the Association of International Bond Dealers (AIBD), the International Capital Market Association was formed in July 2005 from the merger of International Primary Market Association and the International Securities Market Association (formerly the AIBD) to create an association that covered both primary and secondary international capital markets.

== History ==
The International Capital Market Association has its roots in the creation of the Eurobond market in the early 1960s. Eurobonds created a new market in borrowing in US dollars offshore to avoid US tax regulations, but this itself introduced new problems with settlement and regulation across different jurisdictions. In response a group of bond dealers representing banks and securities firms established the Association of International Bond Dealers (AIBD) in 1969.

In the years that followed, AIBD enacted a series of rules and recommendations governing market practice, providing stability and order to the international capital market.

In the 1980s AIBD began to provide data services to the market and in 1989 launched the transaction matching, confirmation and regulatory reporting system, known as TRAX. In 1992 AIBD changed its name to International Securities Market Association (ISMA).

Separately the International Primary Market Association (IPMA) was founded in 1984 by a number of major banks to provide basic recommendations for the primary capital market.

In April 2009, ICMA sold its market services business, including TRAX, to Euroclear.

== See also ==
- Bond Dealers of America
- Securities Industry and Financial Markets Association
- Global Financial Markets Association
