= Climate reparations =

Climate reparations are a type of requested loss and damage payments for damage and harm caused by climate change, which may include debt cancellation. The term climate reparations differs from simple "loss and damage," in that it is based on the concept of reparations, that compensation holds countries accountable for historical emissions, and is an ethical and moral obligation.

"The idea behind calls for loss and damage funding is that the countries that have done most to pollute the atmosphere, and grown rich doing so, should compensate," according to The New Republic.. Frontline communities have expanded the conversation on global climate reparations to go beyond situations like Loss and Damage. One such example is the working statement drafted by community leaders via a Taproot Earth assembly process co-created this statement, "Global Climate reparations is the restoration of healthy and balanced relationships with all that comprise a shared global ecosystem. Reparative action begins with those who benefit most from the historic and current systems of oppression. It requires the abolition of debt, restitution for injustice and the establishment of accountable systems rooted in Black and Indigenous liberation for all oppressed people and future generations."

At the 42nd session of the Human Rights Council in 2019, United Nations High Commissioner for Human Rights, Michelle Bachelet, cautioned that the projected levels of global warming pose 'catastrophic' risks for human rights. She further emphasized that climate change jeopardizes the enjoyment of various fundamental rights, including the rights to life, access to water and sanitation, food, health, housing, self-determination, cultural identity, and development. Furthermore, the High Commissioner expressed that; human rights obligations require that states collectively cooperate toward the promotion of human rights, globally, including adequate financing from those who can best afford it. This requires climate change mitigation, adaptation, and rectification of damage.

The subject of reparations must be considered, with equity, to be the center of global response. This exacts that the counties who have disproportionately created the environmental crisis must do more to compensate for the damages that has been caused, including respecting vulnerable countries. Generally, reparations are an effort to redress societal harm through the acknowledgement of wrongdoing and monetary means. Acceptance of responsibility, followed by undertakings that address the repair of injustices to society and widespread harm are key principles of reparatory justice.

In the context of climate change, it would require identifying categorically any states that have contributed the highest emission intensity of greenhouse gasses in relation to the emission standards.The aim is to encourage accountability and make concessions for sustainable practices to rectify the serious damage inflicted disproportionately on low income countries.

== Current efforts ==
Climate reparations have been under discussion in connection with the catastrophic 2022 Pakistan floods. As of October 14, 2022, the Scottish government is calling for loss and damage funding as a moral responsibility.

Loss and damage was discussed at COP26. As a part of its COP26 coverage, New York Magazine featured a David Wallace-Wells article about climate reparations on its cover. A Bangladeshi consultant remarked at COP26, "The term ‘loss and damage’ is a euphemism for terms we’re not allowed to use, which are ‘liability and compensation' ... ‘Reparations’ is even worse."

At COP27, climate reparations, in the form of loss and damage funding for developing nations, are "top of the agenda", according to the World Economic Forum. Environment and Climate Change Canada has announced support for discussion of "loss and damage," and the U.S. has announced support for "formal negotiations over possible climate reparations."

Two days before the COP27 talks began, a compromise was reached, "that discussion would focus on 'cooperation and facilitation' not 'liability or compensation.'"

Vanuatu's starting point for climate reparations at COP27 is US$117 million.

At the United Nations Framework Convention on Climate Change, there have been a consistent opposition to climate reparations from the wealthiest and most powerful nations. These same nations have benefited from current carbon emissions and using an excess of their atmospheric budget. Furthermore, this would require the redistribution of resources from the wealthy nations to colonized areas across the globe.

== Considerations for implementation ==
A 2023 study published in One Earth estimated that the top 21 fossil fuel companies will owe cumulative climate reparations of $5.4 trillion over the period 2025–2050.

Climate reparations have been described as a "human rights challenge."

A "corrective justice model" could be based on governments accepting moral responsibility for damage to climate. In this model, the countries most responsible provide funding to the affected, poorer countries, which has done relatively little damage to climate. Funds might be distributed by an “international compensation commission,” which adjudicates claims by affected countries.

Another approach would be lawsuits against corporations responsible for carbon emissions or damage to climate, in which courts would determine the funding to be distributed to affected parties.

Compensation could be distributed based on a "Polluter Pays" principle, meaning "that in addition to having to cover the expense of corrective action, the polluter also has to pay to compensate those who have suffered environmental harm as a result of their conduct."

Mechanisms for distribution of funding could include debt forgiveness and direct grants for climate adaptation and mitigation efforts.

Challenges for implementation include accountability and evaluation to ensure that funds do not disappear due to corruption. Although IPCC has a task force on measuring emissions, it does not yet have a task force capable of establishing metrics for climate mitigation impact.

== Opposition ==
Some opponents have argued that current generations should not be considered responsible for the greenhouse gas emissions of their ancestors. Since it was not widely understood before 1990 that greenhouse gas emissions would be a problem, some opponents argue that pre-1990 emissions should not be taken into consideration.

A 2013 study by Richard Heede, co-founder and director of the Climate Accountability Institute, spurred subsequent research by Heede and his colleagues. Their findings revealed that 90 fossil fuel companies were responsible for nearly two-thirds of the observed rise in global surface temperatures. These findings concluded that a relatively small number of corporations have been knowingly responsible for large amounts of damaging emission intensity for forty years, and argues that a public which has been willfully deceived by corporate public relations campaigns should not be expected to pay for these damages.

The ambiguity surrounding the scope of remedial obligations, along with the potential for demands of comprehensive reparation schemes, has effectively prevented industrialized nations from openly acknowledging their responsibility. Given the high risks associated with admitting fault, typically, Western leaders have frequently adopted a stance of doubt and denial by rejecting the scientific evidence of human-caused climate change altogether.This provides leverage to dismiss any justification for imposing specific obligations on certain industrialized states regarding climate reparations.

== Proponents ==
Vanuatu, a small island nation vulnerable to sea-level rise, has considered suing for climate reparations.

Pakistan and other nations from the Global South will be pushing for climate reparations at COP27.

Organizations supporting debt cancellation as a means of climate finance include the African Forum and Network on Debt and Development, the CARICOM Reparations Committee, the Transnational Accountability & Justice Initiative, Fridays for Future Bangladesh, and the Jubilee Debt Campaign. Climate campaigners have estimated that the G20 nations are collectively responsible for about 80% of greenhouse gas emissions, and some assert that expecting the poorer countries to bear the brunt of climate impacts is essentially continuing a legacy of colonialism and oppression connected with extractive industries.

Fridays for Future strikes “for climate reparations and justice" took place in about 450 locations in September 2022, including Berlin, Kinshasa, Bengalauru, India, New Zealand, and Japan.

An opinion piece in the Bulletin of the Atomic Scientists suggests that "rather than on locking down borders as a response to climate migration,' it is important to acknowledge "climate displacement as something driven by our fossil-fueled way of life in the Global North," and "focus on the question of responsibility and reparations, in a moral, legal, and financial framework under international law."

The CARICOM Reparations Commission is more blunt: "Either we allow climate migrants to move in, or we compensate these refugees financially for the damages caused by our greenhouse gas emissions."

== Precedent ==
The principle of loss and damage appears in the 2015 Paris Agreement as a mechanism for climate finance.

== See also ==
- Climate finance
- Reparations (transitional justice)
- Climate ethics
- Climate change mitigation
- Climate change adaptation
