= Loss and damage (climate change) =

Concept to address adverse effects of climate change

Loss and damage (in the context of climate change) is a concept to describe results from the adverse effects of climate change and how to deal with them (beyond climate change adaptation). There has been slow progress on implementing mitigation and adaptation. Some losses and damages are already occurring, and further loss and damage is unavoidable. There is a distinction between economic losses and non-economic losses. The main difference between the two is that non-economic losses involve things that are not commonly traded in markets.

The appropriate response by governments to loss and damage has been disputed since the UNFCCC's adoption of the term and concept. Establishing liability and compensation for loss and damage has been a long-standing goal for vulnerable and developing countries in the Alliance of Small Island States (AOSIS) and the Least Developed Countries Group in negotiations. However, developed countries have resisted this. The present UNFCCC mechanism to address loss and damage, the "Warsaw International Mechanism for Loss and Damage", focuses on research and dialogue rather than liability or compensation. At COP 27 in 2022, after years of negotiation, nations agreed on a proposal to establish a multilateral loss and damage fund to support communities in averting, minimizing, and addressing damages and risks where adaptation is not enough or comes too late.

== Definition ==
Despite the increasing dialogue and attention to the topic, it is also noted that there is 'not one definition of L&D'. In fact, the UN distinguishes between L&D (Loss and Damage) as the dialogue under the negotiations for the UNFCCC and 'losses and damages' as the impacts seen and researched.

The exact wording in the IPCC Sixth Assessment Report is: "Research has taken Loss and Damage (capitalised letters) to refer to political debate under the United Nations Framework Convention on Climate Change (UNFCCC) following the establishment of the Warsaw Mechanism on Loss and Damage in 2013, which is to 'address loss and damage associated with impacts of climate change, including extreme events and slow onset events, in developing countries that are particularly vulnerable to the adverse effects of climate change.' Lowercase letters (losses and damages) have been taken to refer broadly to harm from (observed) impacts and (projected) risks and can be economic or non-economic (Mechler et al., 2018)."

Loss can be understood as irreversible harm caused by climate change, for example, through the complete destruction or permanent reduction in the functioning of assets, infrastructure, or resources, the complete submergence of small island nations due to sea-level rise, the irreversible extinction of a species, or the permanent loss of cultural heritage sites due to erosion caused by extreme weather events.

Damage refers to harmful effects and costs associated with climate change that can be quantified and potentially compensated (including economic, social, and environmental costs). Damage can be temporary or partially reversible, and it often involves repair, restoration, or compensation, for example, the destruction of infrastructure by hurricanes, economic losses due to crop failure caused by drought, or the costs of relocating coastal communities due to erosion and rising sea levels.

Loss and damage is connected to provision of climate finance and support, including liability, compensation and litigation. Loss and damage is also connected closely to mitigating greenhouse gas emissions and adapting to climate risks. Losses and damages arise when mitigation and adaptation actions to reduce climate impacts fail. They include the damages (and the risks of future damages) beyond those addressed by mitigation and adaptation. These losses and damages are sometimes referred to as 'residual' impacts or risks. Given the slow progress on implementing mitigation and adaptation, some losses and damages are already occurring, and further loss and damage is unavoidable.

The UNFCCC has defined loss and damage to include harms resulting from sudden-onset events (climate disasters, such as cyclones) as well as slow-onset processes (such as sea level rise). Loss and damage can occur in human systems (such as livelihoods) as well as natural systems (such as biodiversity), though the emphasis in research and policy is on human impacts. In human systems, a distinction is made between economic losses and non-economic losses. Economic losses and damage affect resources, goods and services that are commonly traded in the market. Non-economic losses and damage contain loss of family members and disappearance of cultures. The main difference between the two is that non-economic losses involve things that are not commonly traded in markets.

Climate reparations are loss and damage payments which are based on the concept of reparations. To proponents, they are a form of climate justice. Compensation is necessary to hold countries accountable for loss and damage resulting from historical emissions, and is an ethical and moral obligation. A Bangladeshi consultant remarked at COP26, "The term 'loss and damage' is a euphemism for terms we're not allowed to use, which are 'liability and compensation' ... 'Reparations' is even worse."

== Early negotiations ==
As the UNFCCC was being drafted in 1991, the AOSIS proposed the creation of an international insurance pool to "compensate the most vulnerable small island and low-lying coastal developing countries for loss and damage arising from sea level rise". In the proposal, the amount to be contributed by each country to this pool would be determined by their relative contribution to global emissions and their relative share of global gross national product, a formula "modelled on the 1963 Brussels Supplementary Convention on Third Party Liability in the field of Nuclear Energy". This proposal was rejected, and when the UNFCCC was adopted in 1992 it contained no mention of loss or damage.

Loss and damage was first referred to in a formally-negotiated UN text in the 2007 Bali Action Plan, which called for "Disaster reduction strategies and means to address loss and damage associated with climate change impacts in developing countries that are particularly vulnerable to the adverse effects of climate change".

== Warsaw International Mechanism for Loss and Damage ==
The Warsaw International Mechanism for Loss and Damage, created in 2013, acknowledges that "loss and damage associated with the adverse effects of climate change includes, and in some cases involves more than, that which can be reduced by adaptation". Its mandate includes "enhancing knowledge and understanding", "strengthening dialogue, coordination, coherence and synergies among relevant stakeholders", and "enhancing action and support, including finance, technology and capacity-building, to address loss and damage associated with the adverse effects of climate change". However, it makes no provisions for liability or compensation for loss and damage. The only reason loss and damage was even discussed in Warsaw was because the entire delegation of developing countries staged a walkout at negotiations.

The Warsaw International Mechanism on Loss and Damage was set up in 2013 as a climate policy mechanism to deal with climate-related effects in highly vulnerable countries and was endorsed in 2015 by the Paris Agreement. Yet, the concepts, methods, tools, and directions for policy and implementation of loss and damage have remained contested and vague.

The Paris Agreement provides for the continuation of the Warsaw International Mechanism but explicitly states that its inclusion "does not involve or provide a basis for any liability or compensation". The inclusion of this clause was the condition on which developed countries, particularly the United States, agreed to include a reference to loss and damage.

== Strengthened agreement on funding ==
=== Loss and Damage Fund ===
The Loss and Damage Fund is a climate finance mechanism created during the 27th Conference of Parties (COP), held in Egypt in 2022. The fund was designed to address loss and damage, to support communities when adaptation strategies are inadequate or implemented too late, and damage and risk has already happened.

=== Paris climate finance summit ===
Before the Paris climate finance summit in June 2023 more than 100 leading economists signed a letter calling for the establishment of an extreme wealth tax as a loss and damage mechanism as the 1% of richest people, who are responsible for twice as many emissions as the poorest 50% (2% tax can generate around 2.5 trillion). If compare the emissions of high income countries with the damage caused to low income by climate change, the result is that rich countries have a debt of around 6 trillion to the low income per year.

The idea was not accepted in the summit, even though some advance was achieved: the World Bank allowed low income countries to temporarily stop paying debts if they are hit by climate disaster (most of financial help to climate vulnerable countries is coming in the form of debts, which often worsens the situation as those countries are overburdened with debts). Around 300 billion dollars was pledged as financial help in the forthcoming years, though trillions are needed to really solve the problem.

== Research on Loss and Damage ==
Non-linear growth in the global warming effect of accumulating long-lived greenhouse gases contributed to economic damages over a 60-year period estimated to be over five times as large as that of a 30-year period (shown in chart). A Nature article estimated future damages from past emissions to be at least an order of magnitude larger than historical damages from the same emissions.

The 5th Assessment Report of the Intergovernmental Panel on Climate Change (IPCC), published in 2013-2014 had no separate chapter on loss and damage, but Working Group II: Impacts, Adaptation and Vulnerability (WG2) Chapter 16 about adaptation limits and constraints, is very relevant for people interested in loss and damage. A qualitative data analysis of what the IPCC 5th Assessment Report has to say about loss and damage surprisingly showed that the term was used much more often in statements about Annex 1 countries (e.g. US, Australia or European countries) than in text about non-Annex 1 countries (most countries in Africa, Asia Latin America and the Pacific), which tend to be more vulnerable to impacts of climate change.

An IPCC assessment of Loss and Damage in 2018 found that residual risks (risks beyond those addressed by adaptation actions) will rise with further warming. This may lead to impacts beyond adaptation limits. The IPCC 6th Assessment Report included a section on Loss and Damage. Some of the main topics of UNFCCC negotiation texts and of scientific research in this area are risk finance (for residual risks), finance sources and options for losses and damages, and transformative finance. Examples for transformative finance include financing relocation and retreat of assets and communities, or for switching livelihoods when current ones become unfeasible.

A 2026 study published in Nature estimated that, from 1990 through 2020, carbon dioxide emissions in the US caused $10.2 trillion in cumulative damages by 2020, with about 30% occurring within the US itself. Damages from China were estimated at $8.7 trillion, and from the EU, $6.42 trillion. The researchers said that future damages from past emissions are at least an order of magnitude larger than historical damages from the same emissions.
