= Loss and Damage Fund =

UN climate finance mechanism

The Loss and Damage Fund is a climate finance mechanism created during the 27th Conference of Parties (COP), held in Egypt in 2022. The fund was designed to address loss and damage, to support communities when adaptation strategies are inadequate or implemented too late, and damage and risk has already happened.

== Description ==
This was an agreement between the nations to establish a multilateral loss and damage fund to support communities in averting, minimizing, and addressing damages and risks, after three decades of negotiation on loss and damage caused by climate change. Finally, the 27th Conference of Parties (COP) adopted a proposal drafted by the Warsaw International Mechanism for Loss and Damage. This fund will be available to support poorer countries for the losses and damages caused by climate change. The parties agree to utilise the Santiago Network, established at COP25, to provide technical assistance in averting, minimizing, and addressing loss and damage. The fund will operate as a financial mechanism of the Paris Agreement. During COP29 in Baku, it was announced that the fund was ready to receive contributions, and that it will start financing projects in 2025.

At previous COP events, industrialised nations blocked attempts by low and middle-income countries asking for financial support with their climate adaptation plans. At COP26 in Glasgow, Scotland became the first Global North country to pledge bilateral finance specifically for loss and damage. In the following year, at COP27, the agreement to support countries for loss and damage from climate change was signed, and that was seen by many as a major breakthrough.

In March 2025, the administration of U.S. president Donald Trump withdrew the country's representatives from the Loss and Damage Fund.
