= List of companies of Trinidad and Tobago =

Location of Trinidad and Tobago

Trinidad and Tobago, officially the Republic of Trinidad and Tobago, is a twin island country situated off the northern edge of the South American mainland, 11 kilometres (6.8 miles) off the coast of northeastern Venezuela and 130 kilometres (81 miles) south of Grenada. Trinidad and Tobago is one of the wealthiest and most developed nations in the Caribbean and is listed in the top 40 (2010 information) of the 70 High Income countries in the world. Its GNI per capita of US$20,070 (2014 GNI at Atlas Method) is one of the highest in the Caribbean. In November 2011, the OECD removed Trinidad and Tobago from its list of Developing Countries. Trinidad's economy is strongly influenced by the petroleum industry. Tourism and manufacturing are also important to the local economy. Tourism is a growing sector, although not as proportionately important as in many other Caribbean islands. Agricultural products include citrus and cocoa.

== Notable firms ==
This list includes notable companies with primary headquarters located in the country. The industry and sector follow the Industry Classification Benchmark taxonomy. Organizations which have ceased operations are included and noted as defunct.

Notable companies Status: P=Private, S=State; A=Active, D=Defunct
Name	Industry	Sector	Headquarters	Founded	Notes	Status	
Agricultural Development Bank of Trinidad and Tobago	Financials	Banks	Port of Spain	1945	Bank	S	A
Air Caribbean	Consumer services	Airlines	Port of Spain	1993	Airline, defunct 2000	P	D
Atlantic LNG	Oil & gas	Exploration & production	Point Fortin	1992	Natural gas	P	A
Bermudez Biscuit Company	Consumer goods	Food products	Port of Spain	1923	Foods	P	A
Bmobile	Telecommunications	Mobile telecommunications	Port of Spain	2005	Mobile provider	P	A
BWIA West Indies Airways	Consumer services	Airlines	Piarco	1939	Airline, defunct 2006	P	A
Cable Company of Trinidad and Tobago	Telecommunications	Fixed line telecommunications	Port of Spain	1990	Broadband, defunct 2006	P	D
Cannings Foods Limited	Consumer services	Food retailers & wholesalers	Port of Spain	1912	Food retailer, defunct 1990	P	D
Carib Brewery	Consumer goods	Brewers	San Juan	1947	Brewery	P	A
Caribbean Airlines	Consumer services	Airlines	Piarco	2006	National airline	S	A
Caribbean Beat	Consumer services	Publishing	Port of Spain	1992	Publication	P	A
Central Bank of Trinidad and Tobago	Financials	Banks	Port of Spain	1964	Central bank	S	A
CL Financial	Financials	Banks	Port of Spain	1993	Financial services, defunct 2009	P	D
Copyright Music Organisation of Trinidad and Tobago	Consumer services	Broadcasting & entertainment	Port of Spain	1984	Music industry	P	A
Flavorite Ice Cream	Consumer goods	Food products	San Juan	1970	Ice cream	P	A
Guardian Life Holdings	Financials	Full line insurance	Port of Spain	1847	Insurance and financial services	P	A
Guardian Media Limited	Consumer services	Broadcasting & entertainment	Port of Spain	1917	Broadcasting and press	P	A
House of Angostura	Consumer goods	Distillers & vintners	Port of Spain	1830	Distillery	P	A
K.C. Confectionery Limited	Consumer goods	Food products	Couva	1922	Confectionery	P	A
Kiss Baking Company Limited	Consumer goods	Food products	Chaguanas	1976	Baked goods	P	A
Laqtel	Telecommunications	Mobile telecommunications	Port of Spain	2002	Mobile start up, defunct 2008	P	D
Mario's Pizzeria	Consumer services	Restaurants & bars	Port of Spain	1972	Pizza chain	P	A
Media and Editorial Projects Limited	Consumer services	Publishing	Port of Spain	1991	Publishing	P	A
MovieTowne	Consumer services	Recreational services	Port of Spain	2002	Cinemas	P	A
National Gas Company of Trinidad and Tobago	Oil & gas	Exploration & production	Point Lisas	1975	State natural gas	S	A
National Infrastructure Development Company	Industrials	Heavy construction	Port of Spain	2005	Construction	S	A
Petrotrin	Oil & gas	Exploration & production	Pointe-à-Pierre	1993	State oil company, defunct 2018	P	D
Republic Bank	Financials	Banks	Port of Spain	1837	Bank	P	A
Rhyners Record Shop	Consumer services	Specialty retailers	Port of Spain	1938	Music retailer, defunct 2005	P	D
Royal Bank of Trinidad and Tobago	Financials	Banks	Port of Spain	1902	Bank, defunct 2008, acquired by Royal Bank of Canada	P	D
S. M. Jaleel and Company	Consumer goods	Soft drinks	Fyzabad	1924	Beverages	P	A
Sacha Cosmetics	Consumer goods	Personal products	Freeport	1979	Cosmetics	P	A
Solo Beverage Company	Consumer goods	Soft drinks	Barataria	1949	Soft drinks	P	A
TBC Radio Network	Consumer services	Broadcasting & entertainment	Port of Spain	1947	Radio network, part of Guardian Media Limited	P	A
Telecommunications Services of Trinidad and Tobago (TSTT)	Telecommunications	Fixed line telecommunications	Port of Spain	1991	Government 51%/LLA 49%	S	A
Tobago Express	Consumer services	Airlines	Piarco	2001	Passenger airline, defunct 2007	P	D
Trinidad and Tobago Electricity Commission	Utilities	Conventional electricity	Port of Spain	1946	Power	S	A
Trinidad and Tobago Stock Exchange	Financials	Investment services	Port of Spain	1981	Primary exchange	P	A
TruValu Supermarket	Consumer services	Food retailers & wholesalers	Trincity	1978	Supermarket chain	P	A
TTPost	Industrials	Delivery services	Piarco	1999	Postal services	S	A
UDeCOTT	Industrials	Heavy construction	Port of Spain	1994	State-owned construction	S	A
Unit Trust Corporation	Financials	Investment services	Port of Spain	1981	Mutual funds	P	A
Water and Sewerage Authority	Utilities	Water	Saint Joseph	1965	Water distribution	S	A
Willies Ice Cream	Consumer goods	Food products	Chaguanas	1986	Ice cream	P	A

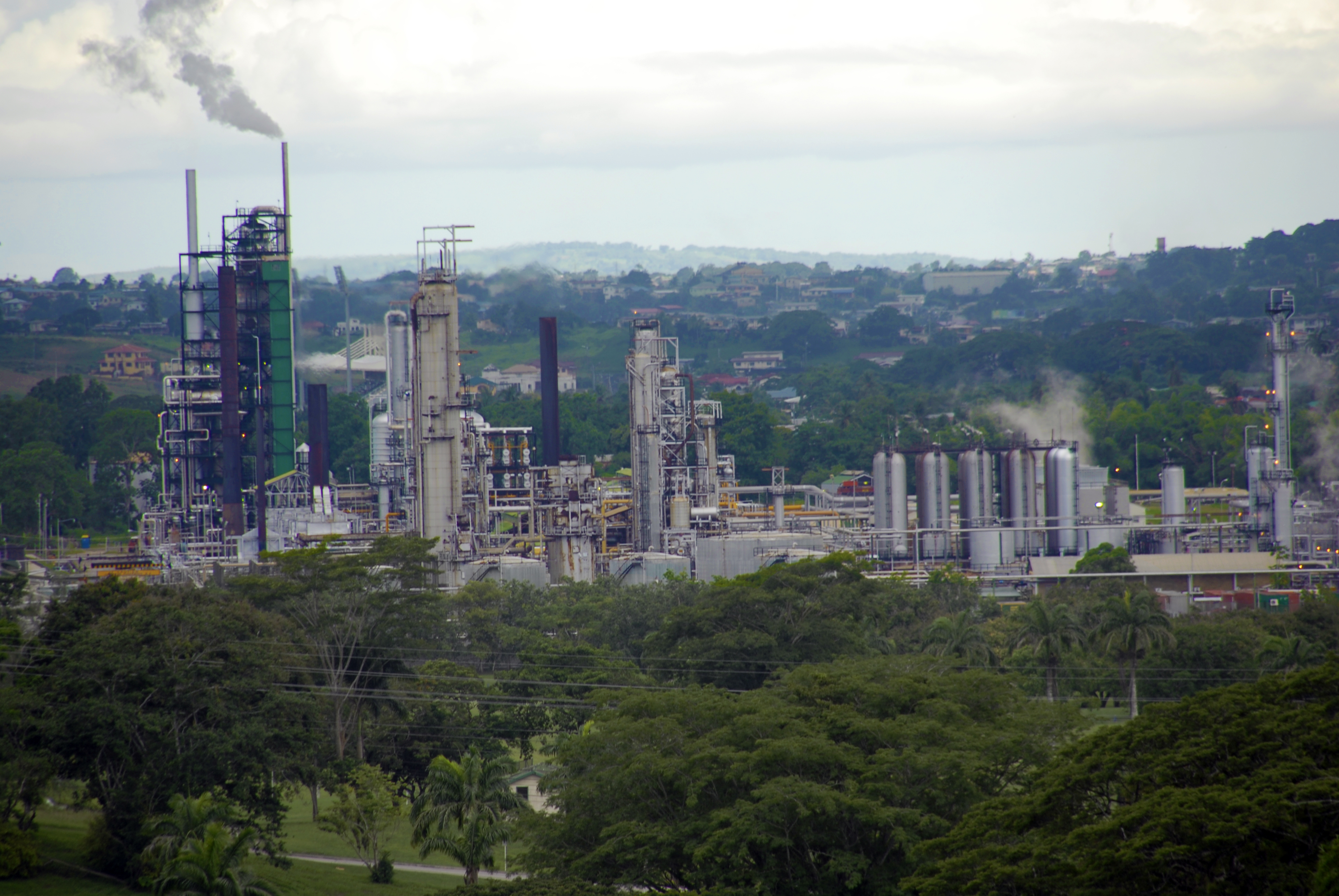
The oil refinery at Pointe-à-Pierre

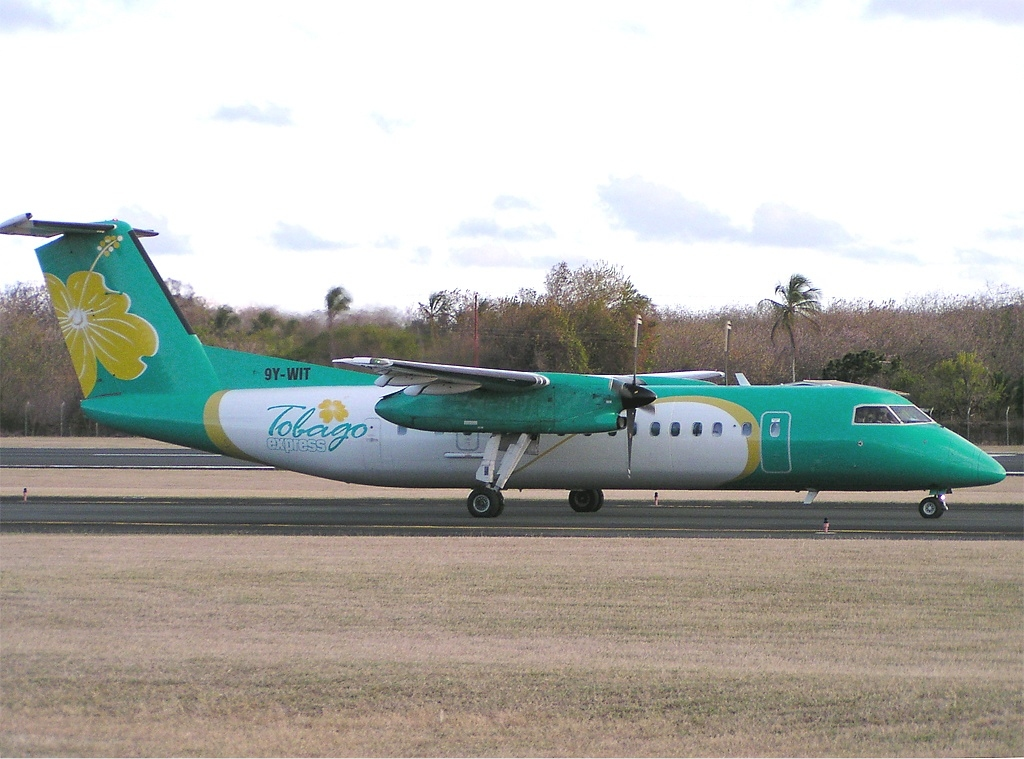
Tobago Express Dash 8-300 at Robinson International in Tobago

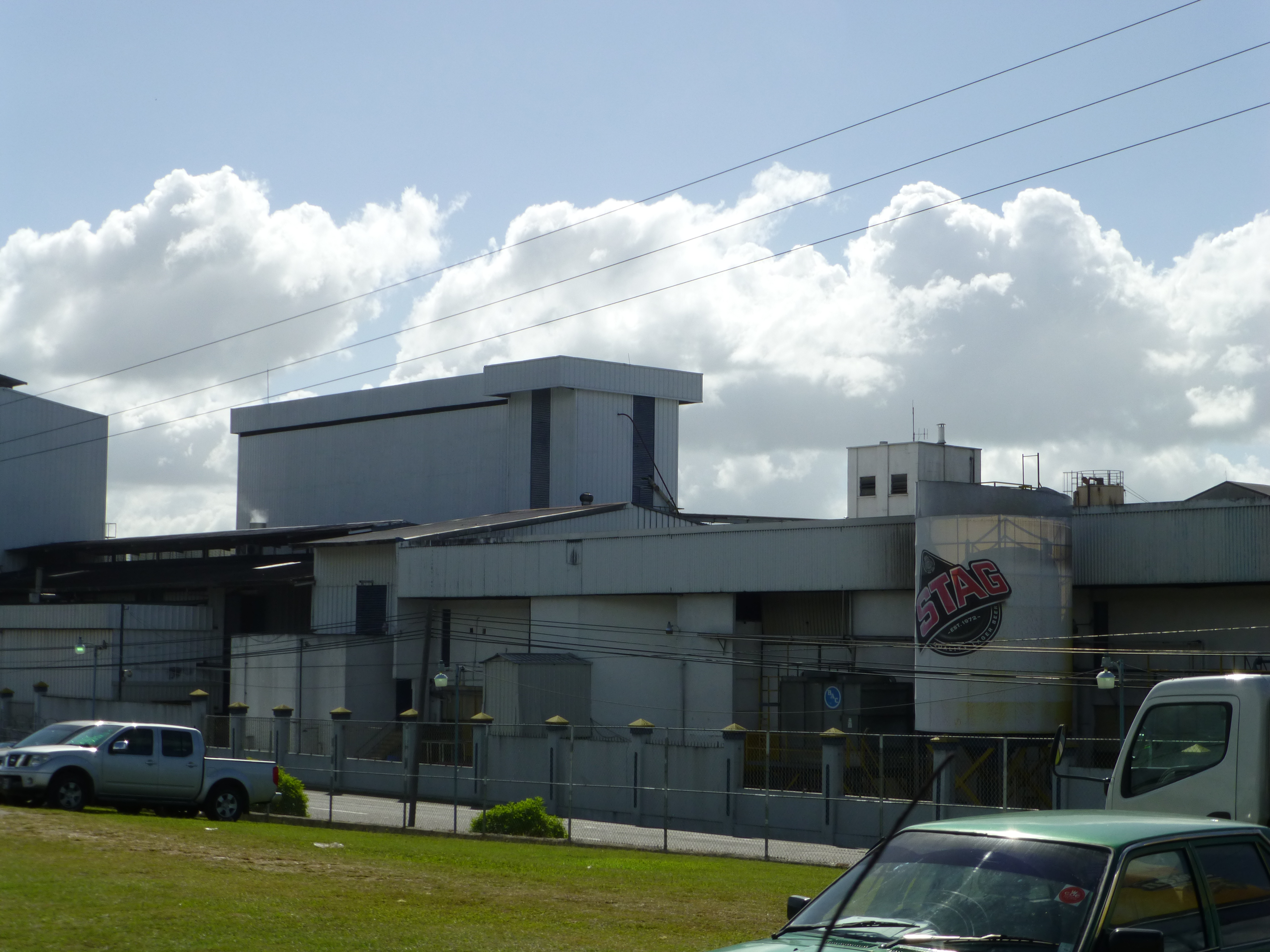
Carib Brewery on Trinidad

== See also ==
- Economy of Trinidad and Tobago
- List of airlines of Trinidad and Tobago
