= Economy of Trinidad and Tobago =

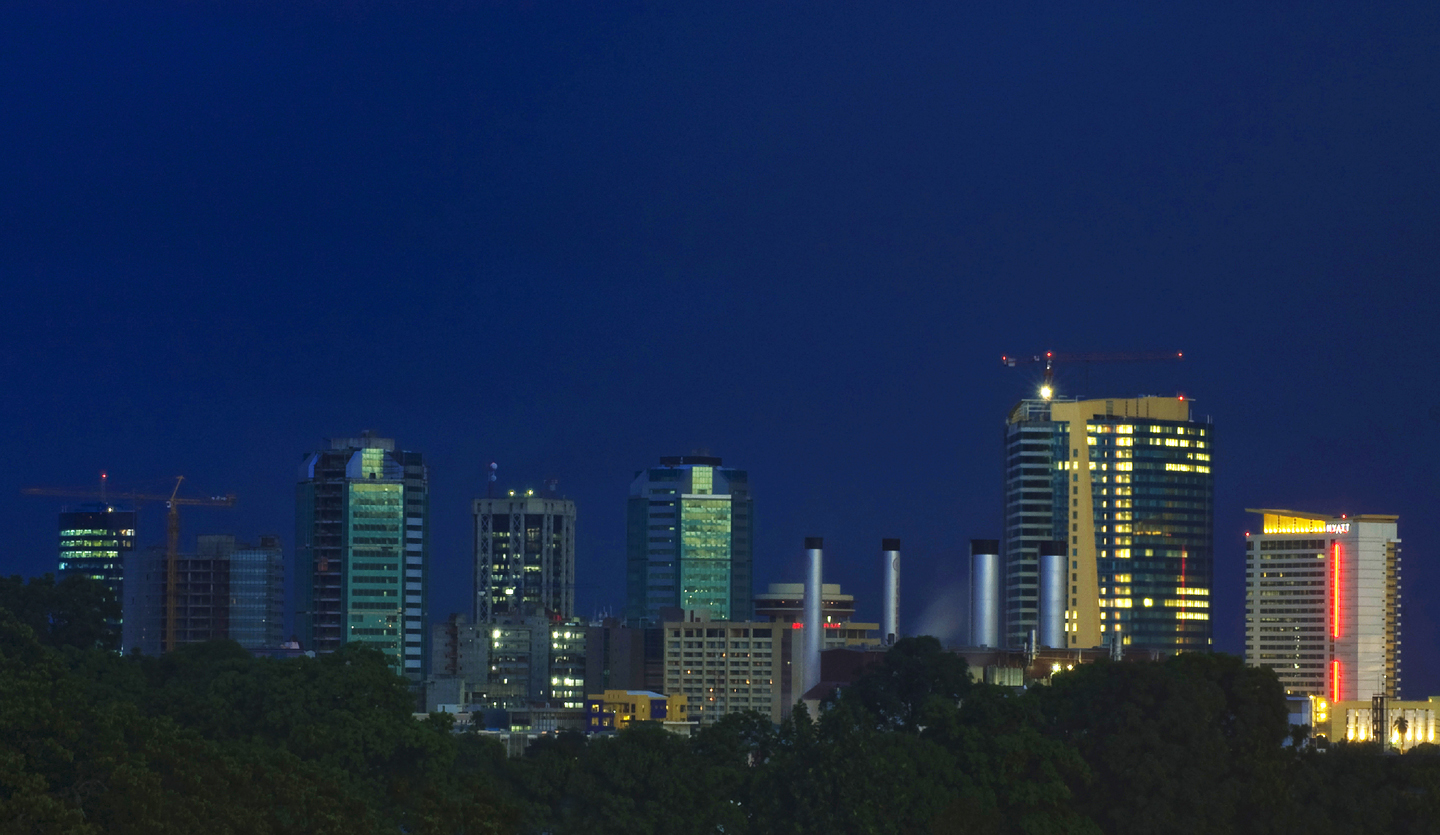
- Port of Spain, the financial centre of Trinidad and Tobago
- Currency: Trinidad and Tobago dollar (TTD, TT$)
- Fiscal year: 1 October – 30 September
- Trade organisations: WTO, CARICOM
- Country group: Developing/Emerging; High-income economy

Statistics
- Population: ▲1,367,558 (2021)
- GDP: ▲$26.47 billion (nominal; 2025); ▲$51.68 billion (PPP; 2025)
- GDP rank: 115th (nominal; 2025); 134th (PPP; 2025)
- GDP growth: ▲1.4% (2023); ▲1.4% (2024); ▲2.4% (2025); ▲1.1% (2026f)
- GDP per capita: ▲$18,440 (nominal; 2025); ▲$36,020 (PPP; 2025)
- GDP per capita rank: 60th (nominal; 2025); 59th (PPP; 2025)
- GDP by sector: agriculture: 0.4%; industry: 48.8%; services: 50.8% (2017 est.)
- Inflation (CPI): ▲4.5% (June 2022)
- Population below national poverty line: 4% (2007 est.)
- Gini coefficient: 39.0 (2012 est.)
- Human Development Index: ▲0.807 very high (2023)(72nd); N/A IHDI (2019)
- Labour force: ▲595,700 (Q4 2025)
- Labour force by occupation: agriculture: 3.8%; manufacturing, mining, and quarrying: 12.8%; construction and utilities: 20.40%; services: 62.9% (2007 est.)
- Unemployment: ▼4.3% (Q4 2025)
- Main industries: petroleum and petroleum products, liquefied natural gas (LNG), methanol, ammonia, urea, steel products, beverages, food processing, cement, cotton textiles

External
- Exports: $11 billion (2015 est.)
- Export goods: petroleum and petroleum products, liquefied natural gas (LNG), methanol, ammonia, urea, steel products, beverages, cereal and cereal products, sugar, cocoa, coffee, citrus fruit, vegetables, flowers
- Main export partners: United States(+) 37% Brazil(+) 8.2% Argentina(+) 8.0% Chile(+) 7.2% Peru(+) 4.5% (2015 est.)
- Imports: $5.9 billion (2015 est.)
- Import goods: mineral fuels, lubricants, machinery, transportation equipment, manufactured goods, food, chemicals, live animals
- Main import partners: United States(+) 38% China(-) 8.2% Singapore(+) 4.6% (2015 est.)
- Gross external debt: ▲$32.06 billion (2021)

Public finance
- Government debt: ▲92.1% of GDP (Jun 2021 est.)
- Foreign reserves: $6.75 billion (Jan 2022 est.)
- Revenue: TT$43.33 billion (2022 est.)
- Spending: TT$52.43 billion (2022 est.)
- Credit rating: Standard & Poor's: BBB-; Outlook: Stable; Moody's: Ba2; Outlook: Stable
- All values, unless otherwise stated, are in US dollars.

Trinidad and Tobago is a high-income economy, with a GDP per capita (at 2024$ PPP) of about $36000, which is slightly less than the Bahamas and Panama (both at about $41000) and significantly less than Canada (about $65000), Guyana (about $80000), and the US (about $86000). Unlike most of the English-speaking Caribbean, the country's economy is primarily industrial, with an emphasis on petroleum and petrochemicals. The country's wealth is attributed to its large reserves and exploitation of oil and natural gas.

Trinidad and Tobago was ranked as having one of the poorest investment climates in the Caribbean (15th of 17 countries) in 2024. Its per capita GDP experienced rapid growth through the mid-2000s (grew by 7.1% per annum in the 10 years through 2006), but has since stagnated and then declined (shrank by 1.8% per annum in the 10 years through 2023). Growth through the mid-2000s was fueled by investments in liquefied natural gas (LNG) and petrochemicals. Additional petrochemical, aluminium, and plastics projects are in various stages of planning.

In 2023, Trinidad and Tobago was the 42nd largest producer of natural gas in the world (and the largest in the Caribbean); it was the 55th largest producer of oil in the world (and the 2nd largest in the Caribbean after Guyana). Its economy is heavily dependent on these resources. It also supplies manufactured goods, notably food and beverages, as well as cement to the Caribbean region. Oil and gas account for about 40% of GDP and 80% of exports, but only 5% of employment.

== Regional financial center ==
The country is also a regional financial center, and tourism is a growing sector, although it is not proportionately as important as in many other Caribbean islands. The economy benefits from a growing trade surplus. Economic growth reached 12.6% in 2006 and 5.5% in 2007 as prices for oil, petrochemicals, and LNG remained high, and as foreign direct investment continued to grow to support expanded capacity in the energy sector.

Trinidad and Tobago's infrastructure is adequate by regional standards. A major expansion of the Piarco International Airport in Trinidad, the country's main airport, was completed in 2001. There are reliable, extensive networks of paved roads, sewage pipes, and power utilities in the urban centers. Some rural areas still suffer from water shortages. The government is addressing this problem with the construction of additional desalinization plants. Improvements in transport, telephone service, drainage, and sewerage, especially in rural areas, are among the government's budget priorities.

== Job market ==
In addition the thriving energy sector, the nation controls 0.25% of the world's natural gas with a GDP of twenty billion US dollars (US$20.5b). These factors are quintessential in driving the demand for quality labor, especially in specialized area as it pertains to the energy sector. Such area of specialisation are for the first time in history being sought after in this little nation, but requires the expertise of expats to fill. According to former Prime Minister Patrick Manning, the nation is the financial capital of the Caribbean, and being so heavily reliant on the oil and energy sectors, fosters and facilitates an environment of constant demand for specialized jobs. In addition, the Natural Gas sector is for the first time facing competition from countries such as Qatar and the United States. All these factors are stimulating the need to produce local specialists as the demand increases. There are also clear indications that the nation is at the end of an economic downturn and poised for a period of economic boom.

A wealth of jobs would be created in the short run to feed a diversity of economic demands across all sectors of the economy. Finance minister Winston Dookeran unveiled the largest budget (TT$54b) in the history of the nation in October 2011, reiterating the government's resolve to transform the economy, which will boost investor confidence in the nation. This process of transformation will create a hosts of jobs and numerous foreign investor opportunities. The proverbial wheels of the economy are being oiled the economy and other areas of the economy such as the Financial and Manufacturing Sectors will benefit tremendously from the spin offs.

Government ministers have already made plans to facilitate viable tools in assisting with the roll out. Within the past couple years government agencies have begun to utilize recruitment tools such as agencies and job boards. The government has recognized the usefulness in sourcing and outsourcing labor from different areas. Recruitment on the whole in Trinidad and Tobago have experienced huge strides, from the traditional snail mail to company's emails and job boards. Local experts have mentioned that moving forward in such a small area is a big tool to in executing and rolling out macro plans smoothly.

== Creative industries ==
Recently, the country's economy has been negatively affected by fluctuating oil and gas prices and in an effort to undergo economic transformation through diversification, the government has identified the creative industries, particularly the music, film and fashion sectors, as pivotal to long-term economic sustainability. As such, the Trinidad and Tobago Creative Industries Company Limited (CreativeTT) was established in 2013 to oversee the strategic and business development of the three niche areas of film, fashion and music.

== Energy sector ==
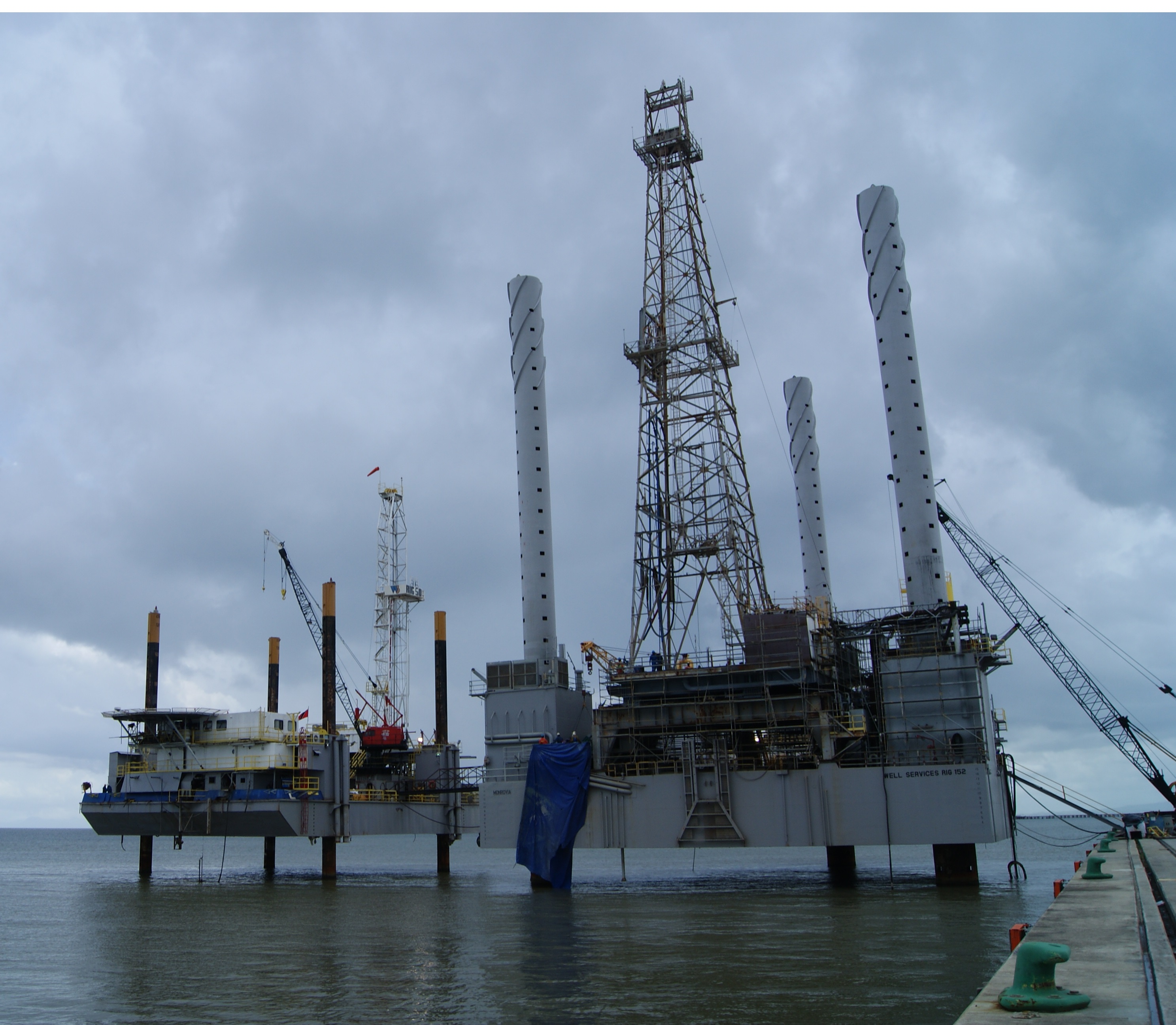
Drilling rigs off the coast of Trinidad.

Trinidad and Tobago, the largest oil and natural gas producer in the Caribbean, has been involved in the petroleum sector for over one hundred years. Cumulative production on land and in shallow water totalled over three billion barrels of oil. In the 1990s, the hydrocarbon sector moved from producing mainly oil to producing mostly natural gas as new fields were developed. According to the EIA, proven crude oil reserves in 2013 were estimated at 728 million barrels, while "3P" natural gas reserves were 25.24 trillion cubic feet (Tcf) (Ryder Scott Audit 2012).

The Phoenix Park Gas Processors Limited (PPGPL) natural gas liquids (NGL) complex, one of the largest natural gas processing facilities in the Western Hemisphere, is located in the Port of Savonetta. It can yield 70,000 barrels per day (bbl/d) of NGL from almost 2 billion cubic feet (Bcf) input per day. After processing removes some of the longer-chain hydrocarbons, the "leaner" gas is transferred to the various power generators (POWERGEN, TGU, or Trinity Power) for the generation of electricity, and to the petrochemical plants for use as a feedstock.

The electricity sector is fueled entirely by natural gas. Trinidad Generation Unlimited power plant, the second combined cycle plant in the country, with a generating capacity of 720MW, was opened on 31 October 2013.

With 11 ammonia plants and seven methanol plants, in 2013 Trinidad and Tobago was the world's largest exporter of ammonia and the second largest exporter of methanol, according to IHS Global Insight. However, overall production and export for ammonia, methanol, urea and UAN decreased to 428,240 metric tonnes (MT) in 2013 from 564,892 MT in 2012.

The Ministry of Energy and Energy Affairs (MEEA) has encouraged investment in projects for "downstream" processing of petrochemicals, such as the manufacture of dimethyl ether (DME) and calcium chloride. Such projects are expected to generate more local employment and more growth in local manufacturing than traditional petrochemical processing.

The energy sector accounts for around 45.0% of the country's GDP. The Central Bank predicted real GDP growth in Trinidad and Tobago of 2.6% in 2014, up from 1.6% in 2013, as the country's energy sector recovered from maintenance delays that had reduced activity in the third quarter of 2013.

MEEA predicted that production of liquefied natural gas (LNG) would rise by 2.0% to 40.0bcm in 2014, following an estimated 1.5% drop in production in 2013. Production of petrochemicals was also expected to rebound, following an 8.0% drop in output in the third quarter of 2013, as several companies aligned their production schedules with the natural gas shortfall.

== Education ==
Education in Trinidad and Tobago is free and is largely and primarily based on the British education system, compulsory between ages 5 and 16. Trinidad and Tobago is considered one of the most literate countries in the World with a literacy rate exceeding 98%. This exceptionally high literacy rate can be attributed, in part, to free tuition from Kindergarten (Pre-School) to University.

The education system generally starts at Pre-School at the early age of two and a half years. This level of tuition is not mandatory but most Trinbagonians start their children's schooling at this stage as children are expected to have basic reading and writing skills when they commence primary school. Students proceed to primary school at the age of five. Seven years are spent in primary school (beginning from infants 1). During the final year of primary school (standard 5), students prepare for and sit the Secondary Entrance Assessment (SEA), which determines the secondary school the child is to attend. For most children and parents, this is a very stressful period.

Students attend secondary school for a minimum of five years and their first major exam is the local NCSE (National Certificate of Secondary Education) examinations, which is done in the third year of this system and administered by the Ministry of Education. The next major exam of the system which is done in the fifth year of school is CSEC (Caribbean Secondary Education Certificate). Children with satisfactory grades may opt to continue high school for a further two-year period (6th form), leading to the Caribbean Advanced Proficiency Examinations (CAPE). Both CSEC and CAPE examinations are held by the Caribbean Examinations Council (CXC).

Public primary and secondary education is free for all, although private and religious schooling is available for a fee.

== Healthcare ==
Trinidad and Tobago operates under a two-tier healthcare system. That is, there is the existence of both private and public facilities.

The Ministry of Health is responsible for leading the health sector. The service provision aspect of public healthcare has been devolved to newly created entities, the Regional Health Authorities (RHAs). Responsibility for the provision of healthcare services in Trinidad and Tobago was devolved from the Ministry of Health to Regional Health Authorities under the Regional Health Authorities Act No. 5 in 1994.

While the Ministry of Health does not directly run health facilities, it is required to play a key role in ensuring that they are properly run, by setting policies, goals and targets for Regions based on assessment of real health needs. This is the main role of the Ministry of Health. The Ministry also allocates resources to the RHAs to finance their operations. The Ministry of Health is shifting its focus to concentrate on policy development, planning, monitoring and evaluation, regulation, financing and research. Citizens can access free health care at public healthcare facilities where health insurance is not required. However, the government is developing the National Health Service in which a package of services is to be determined, as well as a financing strategy.

== Tourism ==
Tourist arrivals of 2024 in %

Tourism is another area which it is believed will soon develop rapidly, and an increased demand for jobs. The European Union Council on Tourism and Trade (EUCTT) has also awarded the nation as being "The Best Tourist Destination for 2012". Local hotels have already begun to make plans to facilitate an influx of European tourists upon the nation receiving this designation. However, the EUCTT is not affiliated with any part of the European Union's Institutions. Despite concerns over the global economy, international tourism demand continues to show resilience. The number of international tourists worldwide grew by 5% (22 million) between January and June 2012, with Asia and the Pacific (+8%) leading the growth among the regions. Given this growth rate a total of one billion international tourists are expected by the end of 2012. In 2011, the total contribution of World Travel & Tourism to global GDP was US$6,346.1bn (9.1% of GDP). In 2011, the Caribbean region received 20.9 million tourists, a growth of 4.4% over the same period in 2010. The Caribbean is the most dependent region on tourism with Travel and Tourism contributing 13.9% (US$47.1bn) to its economic output. Trinidad and Tobago received an estimated 402,058 visitors in 2011, representing 2% of all Caribbean visitor arrivals. Due to the multifaceted nature of tourism, its economic impact is not confined to any single industry. To adequately measure the economic impact of the tourism sector, the United Nations World Travel and Tourism Council (UNWTO) devised the Tourism Satellite Account (TSA), an extension of the System of National Accounts (SNA). The TSA is a detailed production account of the tourism sector showing its linkages to major industries, total employment, capital formation and additional macro-economic variables.

=== Tourist arrival statistics ===
Most visitors arriving to Trinidad and Tobago on short-term basis in 2014 were from the following countries of nationality:

Rank	Country	Number
1	United States	161,539
2	Canada	54,877
3	United Kingdom	37,473
4	Guyana	23,061
5	Venezuela	21,052
6	Barbados	11,629
7	Grenada	6,922
8	Germany	5,154
9	India	3,291
	Total	324,998

== Infrastructure ==
=== Transport ===
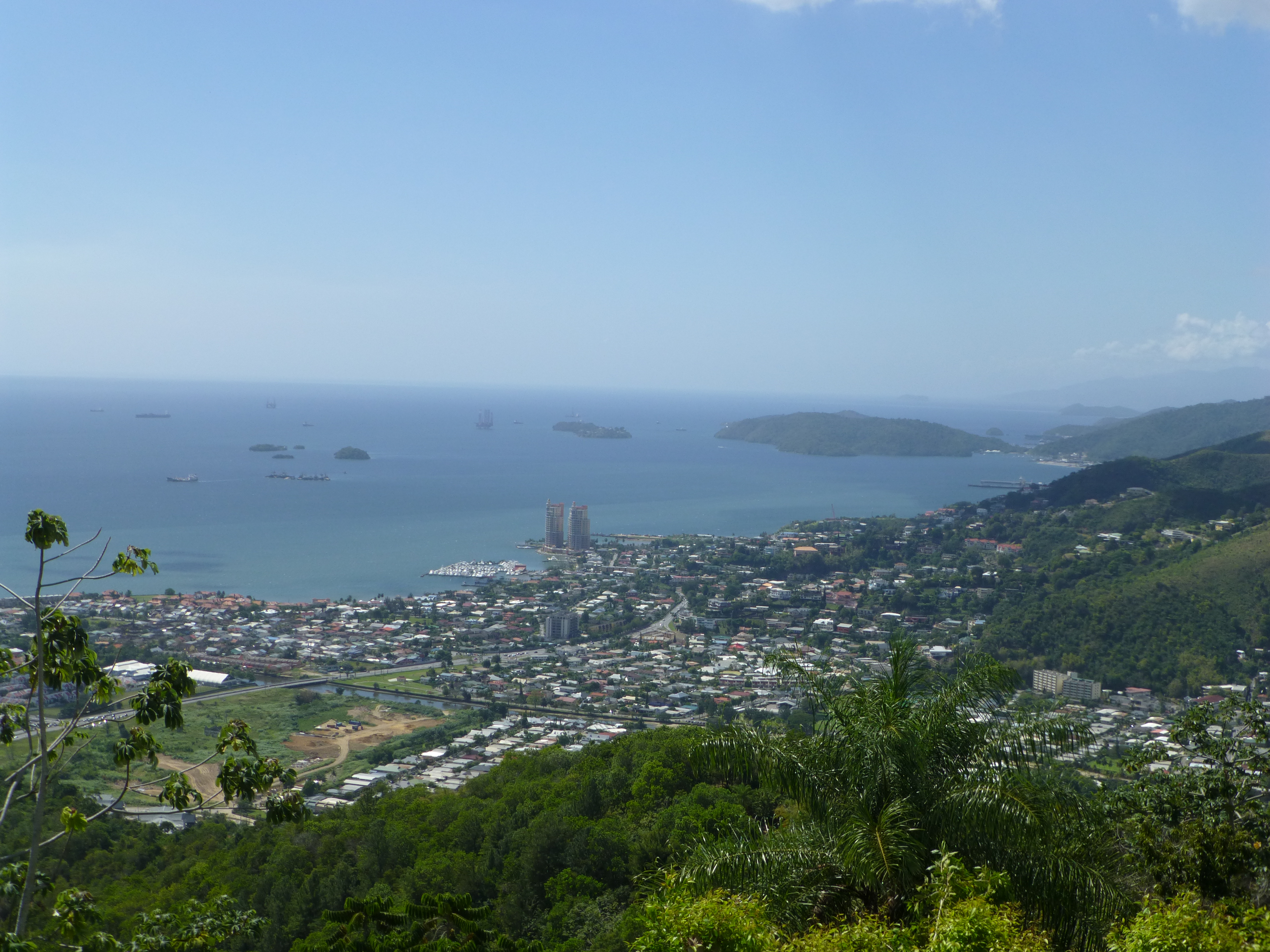
Western main road cuts through several towns

Trinidad and Tobago, a country that relies heavily on industrialisation and tourism, has various transport systems. The nation drives on the left, and has a network of roads and highways. There is also some ports and smaller harbors, as well as highways.

=== Communications and mobile ===
Trinidad and Tobago has relatively modern, robust and reliable Information and Communications Technology (ICT) infrastructure. Mobile phone service is widespread and has been a growing sector for several years. Digicel and Laqtel were granted cellular licenses in 2005, breaking the monopoly of TSTT. However, as of 2015 TSTT and Digicel remain the only mobile providers. There are five broadband service providers/ISPs.

== Miscellaneous data ==
Exports of Trinidad and Tobago by product category (2019) Chemical products Transportation Machines Mineral products Plastics and rubbers Metals Foodstuffs Precious metals Textiles Instruments Animal products Vegetable products Paper goods Footwear and headwear Miscellaneous Stone and glass Wood products Animal and vegetable bi-products Animal hides Arts and antiques Weapons

Economic aid – recipient: $200,000 (2007 est.)

Reserves of foreign exchange and gold: $8.095 billion (February 2018 est.)

Currency: 1 Trinidad and Tobago dollar (TT$) = 100 cents

Exchange rates: Trinidad and Tobago dollars (TT$) per US$1 :

6.7283 (2017) 6.6152 (2016) 6.3298 (2015) 6.3613 (2014) 6.3885 (2013) 6.3716 (2012) 6.4200 (2011 est) 6.3337 (2010) 6.3099 (2009) 6.2896 (2008) 6.3275 (2007) 6.3107 (2006) 6.2842 (2005), 6.2990 (2004), 6.2951 (2003), 6.2487 (2002), 6.2332 (2001), 6.2697 (2000), 6.2963 (1999), 6.2983 (1998), 6.2517 (1997), 6.0051 (1996), 5.9478 (1995)

Stock of direct foreign investment – at home: $12.44 billion (2007)

Stock of direct foreign investment – abroad: $1.419 billion (2007)

Market value of publicly traded shares: $15.57 billion (2006)

Fiscal year: 1 October – 30 September

== See also ==
- List of companies of Trinidad and Tobago
- Central Bank of Trinidad and Tobago
- Climate finance in Trinidad and Tobago
- Ministry of Finance (Trinidad and Tobago)
- National Trade Union Centre of Trinidad and Tobago
- Trinidad and Tobago Stock Exchange
- Trinidad and Tobago dollar
- Economy of the Caribbean
- Economy of South America
- Central banks and currencies of the Caribbean
- List of Commonwealth of Nations countries by GDP
- List of Latin American and Caribbean countries by GDP growth
- List of Latin American and Caribbean countries by GDP (nominal)
- List of Latin American and Caribbean countries by GDP (PPP)
