= Black Reel Award for Outstanding Foreign Film =

Motion picture award for acting

Black Reel Award for Outstanding International Film
- Country: United States
- Presented by: The Black Reel Awards (BRAs)
- First award: Black Reel Awards of 2012
- Most recent winner: On Becoming a Guinea Fowl (2026)
- Website: blackreelawards.com

This page lists the winners and nominees for the Black Reel Award for Outstanding Foreign Film. This award is presented to the director of the film and was first awarded during the 2012 ceremony.

== Winners and nominees ==
Winners are listed first and highlighted in bold.

=== 2010s ===
Year	Film	Country	Director(s)	Ref
2012
2012	**Attack the Block**	**United Kingdom**	**Joe Cornish**	
2012	The First Grader	United Kingdom	Justin Chadwick	
2012	Kinyarwanda	Rwanda	Alrick Brown	
2012	Life, Above All	South Africa	Oliver Schmitz	
2012	Viva Riva!	Congo	Djo Tunda Wa Munga	
2013
2013	**The Intouchables**	**France**	**Éric Toledano and Olivier Nakache**	
2013	Elza	France	Mariette Monpierre	
2013	Ties That Bind	Ghana	Leila Djansi	
2013	Toussaint Louverture	France	Philippe Niang	
2013	Wuthering Heights	United Kingdom	Andrea Arnold	
2014
2014	**War Witch**	**Canada**	**Kim Nguyen**	
2014	Better Mus' Come	Jamaica	Storm Saulter	
2014	Home Again	Canada	Sudz Sutherland	
2014	Nairobi Half Life	Kenya	David Gitonga	
2014	Storage 24	United Kingdom	Johannes Roberts	
2015
2015	**Fishing Without Nets**	**Kenya**	**Cutter Hodierne**	
2015	Difret	Ethiopia	Zeresenay Mehari	
2015	The Double!	United Kingdom	Richard Ayoade	
2015	Freedom Road	South Africa	Shane Vermooten	
2015	Half of a Yellow Sun	Nigeria	Biyi Bandele	
2016
2016	**Girlhood**	**France**	**Céline Sciamma**	
2016	Freetown	Liberia	Garrett Batty	
2016	Honeytrap	United Kingdom	Rebecca Johnson	
2016	Mediterranea	Italy	Jonas Carpignano	
2016	My Friend Victoria	France	Jean-Paul Civeyrac	
2016	Samba	France	Éric Toledano and Olivier Nakache	
2017
2017	**Eye of the Storm**	**Burkina Faso**	**Sékou Traoré**	
2017	Aisha	Tanzania	Chande Omar	
2017	Divines	France	Houda Benyamina	
2017	Lamb	Ethiopia	Yared Zeleke	
2017	Rain the Color of Blue with a Little Red in It	Niger	Christopher Kirkley	
2018
2018	**The Wound**	**South Africa**	**John Trengove**	
2018	Félicité	France	Alain Gomis	
2018	Kati Kati	Kenya	Mbithi Masya	
2019
2019	**Lionheart**	**Nigeria**	**Genevieve Nnaji**	
2019	Green Days by the River	Trinidad	Michael Mooleedhar	
2019	Where Hands Touch	United Kingdom	Amma Asante	
2019	Rafiki	Kenya	Wanuri Kahiu	
2019	Vaya	South Africa	Akin Omotoso	

=== 2020s ===
Year	Film	Country	Director(s)	Ref
2020
2020	**Atlantics**	**Senegal**	**Mati Diop**	
2020	The Boy Who Harnessed the Wind	United Kingdom	Chiwetel Ejiofor	
2020	Farming	United Kingdom	Adewale Akinnuoye-Agbaje	
2020	In Fabric	United Kingdom	Peter Strickland	
2020	Les Misérables	France	Ladj Ly	
2021
2021	**Night of the Kings**	**Senegal**	**Philippe Lacôte**	
2021	His House	United Kingdom	Remi Weekes	
2021	The Life Ahead	Italy	Edoardo Ponti	
2022
2022	**African America**	**South Africa**	**Muzi Mthembu**	
2022	Bitter Sugar	Tunisia	Malik Isasis	
2022	Faya Dayi	Ethiopia	Jessica Beshir	
2023
2023	**Saint Omer**	**France**	**Alice Diop**	
2023	Neptune Frost	Rwanda	Saul Williams and Anisia Uzeyman	
2024
2024	**Rye Lane**	**United Kingdom**	**Raine Allen-Miller**	
2024	Brother	Canada	Clement Virgo	
2024	Our Father, the Devil	Cameroon	Ellie Foumbi	
2025
2025	**Hard Truths**	**United Kingdom**	**Mike Leigh**	
2025	Bird	United Kingdom	Andrea Arnold	
2025	Emilia Pérez	France	Jacques Audiard	
2025	Old Righteous Blues	South Africa	Muneera Sallies	
2025	Nine	South Africa	Erica Joy	
2026
2026	**On Becoming a Guinea Fowl**	**Zambia, United Kingdom, and Ireland**	**Rungano Nyoni**	
2026	My Father's Shadow	United Kingdom	Akinola Davies Jr.	
2026	Night Call	Belgium	Michiel Blanchart	
2026	Souleymane's Story	France	Boris Lojkine	
2026	We Were Here – The Untold History of Black Africans in Renaissance Europe	Germany	Fred Kudjo Kuwornu	

== Multiple nominations ==
2 nominations

- (United Kingdom) Andrea Arnold
- (France) Olivier Nakache
- (France) Éric Toledano

== Tally by country ==
Country	Number of winning films	Number of nominated films
United Kingdom	4	16
France	3	12
South Africa	2	7
Senegal	2	2
Kenya	1	4
Canada	1	3
Nigeria	1	2
Burkina Faso	1	1
Zambia	1	1
(Republic of Ireland) Ireland	1	1
Ethiopia	0	3
Italy	0	2
Rwanda	0	1
(Republic of the Congo) Congo	0	1
Ghana	0	1
Jamaica	0	1
Liberia	0	1
Tanzania	0	1
Niger	0	1
Trinidad and Tobago	0	1
Tunisia	0	1
Cameroon	0	1
Belgium	0	1
Germany	0	1
