= Air Caribbean =

Air Caribbean may refer to the following airlines:

- Air Caribbean (Puerto Rico)
- Air Caribbean (Trinidad and Tobago)

== See also ==
- Aero Caribbean, a Cuban airline
