= Trinidad and Tobago Fashion Company =

FashionTT

Agency overview
- Formed: 2013
- Jurisdiction: Republic of Trinidad and Tobago
- Headquarters: Export House, 151B Charlotte Street, Port of Spain, Trinidad
- Parent agency: CreativeTT, Ministry of Trade and Industry of Trinidad and Tobago
- Website: http://www.fashiontt.co.tt/

The Trinidad and Tobago Fashion Company Limited (FashionTT) was established in 2013. As a subsidiary of the Trinidad and Tobago Creative Industries Company Limited (CreativeTT), FashionTT’s mandate is "to stimulate and facilitate the business development and export activity of the fashion industry in Trinidad and Tobago to generate national wealth." The company provides capacity development workshops, growth strategies and linkages with foreign buyers for local fashion industry stakeholders.

The Strategic Plan for the Fashion Industry of Trinidad and Tobago represents the culmination of extensive work conducted in 2014 which focused on analyzing the sector and identifying cost effective interventions to maximize market growth, exports, and vitality of the industry and its impact on the overall economy of Trinidad and Tobago. The plan outlines a bold new strategic direction and the strategic initiatives that will be undertaken by FashionTT during the period 2015–2020.

== FashionTT and Economic Diversification ==
Trinidad and Tobago is the leading Caribbean producer of oil and gas and its economy is heavily dependent upon these resources. Recently, the country’s economy has become susceptible to fluctuating oil and gas prices and in an effort to undergo economic transformation through diversification, the government has identified the fashion industry as one of three pioneering sectors that are pivotal to long-term economic sustainability. The other two sectors are music and film.

== Projects/Initiatives ==
=== French Caribbean Inward Buyers’ Mission ===
In September 2015, FashionTT hosted its first inward buyers’ mission with merchants and retailers from the French Caribbean. Fourteen local designers showcased their creations for buyers from Martinique and Guadeloupe and all secured large orders for their fashion products to be sold in retail outlets in the French Caribbean market.

=== Fashion UPGRADE! Producing Quality Garments that Meet National and International Standards ===
FashionTT, in collaboration with the Trinidad and Tobago Bureau of Standards (TTBS), hosted this workshop to educate local fashion designers on the approved standard for garment production. Using TTBS’ draft standard as the course content, facilitator Violet Davis-Maurice elaborated on the assessment of garment quality, detailing how and the extent to which garments should be produced in Trinidad and Tobago. This standard is based on international best practice.

=== Value Chain Investment Programme ===
The Fashion Value Chain Investment Programme (VCIP) is the cornerstone of the Strategic Plan for the Fashion Industry. This 5-year programme assesses local firms by an independent international panel who categorizes firms into one of the four levels of the VCIP:

1. The Global Value Chain (GVC) Support Programme
2. Non-Global Value Chain (non-GVC) Support Programme
3. Incubator Programme for New/Young High Potential Companies or Partnerships
4. Firms that are Earmarked for Future Support

The VCIP is a landmark, annual initiative that began in 2017 when the Trinidad and Tobago Fashion Company Limited (FashionTT) convened a three-member international panel to interview twenty-one designers in Trinidad and Tobago. Each candidate was scored based on their responses to a series of questions related to sixteen VCIP criteria:

- Brand Story/Relevance
- Market Experience | Brand Positioning/Clarity
- Design Know-how and Capabilities
- Consumer Knowledge
- Commercial Viability
- Retail Understanding
- Sales Capability/Processes
- Export Production Capacity
- Product Quality | Based on Samples Presented
- Brand Presence
- Marketing Strategy
- Equipment/Operational Capabilities
- General Management
- Financial Health
- Financial Compliance
- Tie-breaker | Total Value of Orders Received, Shipped, Invoiced and Collected

In the inaugural cohort in 2017, 29 designers participated in the programme with 5 being accepted into the Non-GVC tier based on their scores – Millhouse, Ecliff Elie, J Angelique, Charu Lochan Dass and Ted Arthur Leather Collections. These firms received support in improving up to two elements of their value chain by refining their in-house performance or outsourcing some steps locally. This support was provided by Professor at the Fashion Institute of Technology and consultant, Vincent Quan over a one-year period who worked closely with these designers to harness their most significant value chain potentials.

A new cohort of 100 designers was accepted in 2018 with 3 participating in the Global Value Chain tier - Meiling, Charu Lochan Dass and Ecliff Elie. At the end of the 5-year period, FashionTT anticipates that 15 - 25 firms will have improved value chains, thereby enabling the sector to contribute favorably to national wealth.

=== Garment Production Facility ===
FashionTT, in partnership with the University of Trinidad and Tobago (UTT) and Trinidad and Tobago Bureau of Standards (TTBS) is establishing a modern production facility in Trinidad and Tobago. Raymond Wong, Professor at the Fashion Institute of Technology in New York City, has been hired to develop the business model for this facility which is expected to open in the 2018/2019 fiscal year. According to General Manager of FashionTT, Lisa-Marie Daniel, “This garment production facility will allow local designers to become major players in the global fashion scene. Not only will they have access to a first class manufacturing centre but this facility will also ensure the long-term sustainability of our local fashion industry through revenue generation and job creation.”

=== Creativity and Business of Fashion Series ===
In August and September 2016, FashionTT hosted a three-part Creativity and Business of Fashion Workshop.

The first workshop on August 27, 2016 was facilitated by Margaret Bishop, Professor at Fashion Institute of Technology and Parson New School of Design in New York City. Margaret covered a range of topics including the global apparel market, making the best use of your competitive advantage, brand marketing in the digital age, make or break imperatives in the global market and upscaling – building the ability to grow your volume.

The second workshop was facilitated by Deborah Beard, an Associate Chairperson of Technical Design and Professor in both Technical Design and Art and Design at the Fashion Institute of Technology. Participants were educated on: pricing, producing samples and tech packs, creating line sheets, production logistics/optimization, trade show requirements and starting website sales, negotiations and payments and trouble points in manufacturing.

This third workshop on 30 September 2016 had several facilitators: Amar Ramdhanie, Chief Operations Officer of NEDCO Trinidad & Tobago; entertainment lawyer Akilah Phillip; Mario Whiteman, technical examiner at the local intellectual property office; Meghnath Gosein, Unit Leader of Business Services at Caribbean Industrial Research Institution (CARIRI); and representatives from e-commerce company, E-Line. They educated participants on business financing in fashion, finance management, managing contracts in the fashion industry, intellectual property management, the e-commerce offerings in Trinidad and Tobago and lastly, merging creativity, business and innovation.

=== The Business of Fashion Series ===
FashionTT, in conjunction with the Trinidad and Tobago Bureau of Standards (TTBS) and the Tobago House of Assembly (THA), hosted this series of training workshops in July 2017 which sought to educate local designers on the importance of strategically managing their businesses to achieve desired results and revenue. This heightened understanding of business processes and their effects on revenue and export ability, will contribute to the continued growth of the fashion industry and by extension, Trinidad and Tobago’s Gross Domestic Product.

=== Ultra Bespoke Tailoring Programme ===
The Trinidad and Tobago Fashion Company Limited (FashionTT) alongside its parent company, the Trinidad and Tobago Creative Industries Company Limited (CreativeTT) has partnered with the Ministry of Trade and Industry, MIC Institute of Technology and Savile Row Academy, to host a one-year Certificate Programme in Bespoke Tailoring, Pattern Drafting, Cutting and Fitting beginning in March 2018. The main objective of this programme is to provide specialist skills through an intensive training programme. These skills will enable designers to progress into employment on the highest levels of tailoring and within the fashion related industries on an individual level. On a macro level, the programme will enable the tailoring sector in Trinidad and Tobago to flourish through its association with such a well-respected brand as Savile Row Academy, thereby encouraging acceptance into global markets, the growth of the fashion industry and an increase in contribution to the Gross domestic product.
