= Trinidad and Tobago Creative Industries Company =

CreativeTT

Agency overview
- Formed: 2013
- Jurisdiction: Republic of Trinidad and Tobago
- Headquarters: Export House, 151B Charlotte Street, Port of Spain, Trinidad
- Agency executive: Chairman
- Parent agency: Ministry of Trade and Industry of Trinidad and Tobago
- Website: http://www.creativett.co.tt/

The Trinidad and Tobago Creative Industries Company Limited (CreativeTT), established by The Government of the Republic of Trinidad and Tobago through the Ministry of Trade and Industry in 2013, is a wholly owned State enterprise with the mandate ‘to stimulate and facilitate the business development and export activities of the creative industries in Trinidad and Tobago to generate national wealth.’ CreativeTT is therefore responsible for the strategic and business development of the three (3) niche areas and subsectors under its purview- film, fashion and music. As a result, CreativeTT is known as the parent company of three subsidiary companies for the three subsectors. They are Trinidad and Tobago Music Company Limited (MusicTT), Trinidad and Tobago Film Company Limited (FilmTT) and Trinidad and Tobago Fashion Company Limited (FashionTT).

== CreativeTT and the Diversification Thrust ==
Trinidad and Tobago is the leading Caribbean producer of oil and gas and its economy is heavily dependent upon these resources. Recently, the country’s economy has become susceptible to fluctuating oil and gas prices and in an effort to undergo economic transformation through diversification, the government has identified the creative industries, particularly the music, film and fashion sectors, as pivotal to long-term economic sustainability.

== Projects ==
=== Making the Music Video Workshop ===
CreativeTT’s Making the Music Video Workshop was hosted in collaboration with Tempo Networks on 2 – 4 October 2015. The workshop was facilitated by two international award-winning producers from TEMPO Networks, Ron Elliott and Russell Santos as well as TEMPO Trinidad & Tobago Country Manager and Director of Talent & Artist Relations, Arita Edmund. These industry experts addressed all aspects of creating and publishing music videos including the creative treatment and collaboration with artists and other creative stakeholders, the writing process, budgeting and the establishment of deals with artists, labels and production companies.

=== Stakeholder Outreach Initiative ===
On 28 and 29 January 2016 CreativeTT and sister state agency InvesTT joined efforts to host a stakeholder outreach initiative at Piarco International Airport. The two-day initiative targeted passengers on flights from Canada, United States, UK and Europe with a key focus on members of Trinidad and Tobago’s diaspora visiting for Carnival. The joint agency team interacted with incoming and departing passengers in a drive to establish a point of contact with persons interested in investment opportunities and developments in the local creative industries. Chairman of CreativeTT, Ms. Neysha Soodeen, stated, "Over 170 persons expressed interest in T&T’s music, film and fashion industries. Our objective now is to use these contacts to promote our local talent and creative products in the USA, Canada, UK and throughout Europe."

=== Ultra Bespoke Tailoring Programme ===
The Trinidad and Tobago Creative Industries Company Limited (CreativeTT), through its subsidiary the Trinidad and Tobago Fashion Company Limited (FashionTT) has partnered with the Ministry of Trade and Industry, MIC Institute of Technology and Savile Row Academy, to host a one-year Certificate Programme in Bespoke Tailoring, Pattern Drafting, Cutting and Fitting beginning in March 2018.

The main objective of this programme is to provide specialist skills through an intensive training programme. These skills will enable designers to progress into employment on the highest levels of tailoring and within the fashion related industries on an individual level. On a macro level, the programme will enable the tailoring sector in Trinidad and Tobago to flourish through its association with such a well-respected brand as Savile Row Academy, thereby encouraging acceptance into global markets. the growth of the fashion industry and an increase in contribution to the Gross domestic product.

== Subsidiary Companies ==
=== Trinidad and Tobago Music Company Limited (MusicTT) ===
MusicTT was established in 2014 with the mandate to stimulate and facilitate the business development and export activities of the music industry in Trinidad and Tobago to generate national wealth. As a subsidiary of Trinidad and Tobago Creative Industries Company Limited (CreativeTT), MusicTT provides industry-wide strategic direction and action plans toward the development of the music industry as well as guidance and access to music education and capacity development, especially in the business and monetization of local music and protection of the same.

Since inception, MusicTT has hosted the following capacity development workshops and initiatives:

- Feel the Beat Music Symposium
- Live Music District
- Artist Portfolio Development Programme
- Music Export Academy
- Songwriting and Production Camp
- Music Publishing Camp
- Music IP Valuation Workshop
- Songwriting, Production, Mixing and Mastering Workshop
- Open Call for Proposals
- The Business of Calypso Workshop Featuring Calypso Rose
- How to Make a Living From Music Workshop
- National Stakeholder Engagement and Key MusicTT Implementation Projects
- Music Showcase 2017

=== Trinidad and Tobago Film Company Limited (FilmTT) ===
FilmTT is a national agency established in 2006 to facilitate the development of the film industry in Trinidad and Tobago. It came under purview of the Trinidad and Tobago Creative Industries Company Limited (CreativeTT) in 2013. FilmTT provides logistical support and film commission services such as location scouting and research and acts as a liaison with industry partners, the community, production houses and Government agencies.

In recent years, FilmTT has hosted the following initiatives:

- Producers Talk
- Secondary Schools Short Film Festival
- Smartphone Film Festival
- Film Festival Season 2016
- FilmTT Stakeholder Meeting 2017
- Small Marketing and Development Grant

=== Trinidad and Tobago Fashion Company Limited (FashionTT) ===
FashionTT was established in 2013 with the mandate to stimulate and facilitate the business development and export activity of the fashion industry in Trinidad and Tobago to generate national wealth. As a subsidiary of the Trinidad and Tobago Creative Industries Company Limited (CreativeTT), FashionTT provides service for local fashion industry stakeholders primarily fashion designers in the areas of fashion apparel, functional apparel and accessories.

Since inception, FashionTT has hosted the following capacity development workshops and initiatives:

- French Caribbean Inward Buyers Mission
- Fashion UPGRADE! Producing Quality Garments that Meet National and International Standards
- Value Chain Investment Programme
- Garment Production Facility
- Creativity and Business of Fashion Workshop
- Business of Fashion Workshop 2017
- Ultra Bespoke Tailoring Programme

FashionTT recently launched their flagship initiative, the Fashion Value Chain Investment Programme. This five-year programme seeks to improve capacity and export readiness of the local firms and significant production into the international market.

FashionTT, partnership with the University of Trinidad and Tobago, is currently in the process of establishing a local garment production facility in Trinidad and Tobago, set to open in the 2018/2019 fiscal year.
