= Trinidad and Tobago Film Company =

State agency established in 2006

FilmTT

Agency overview
- Formed: 2006
- Jurisdiction: Republic of Trinidad and Tobago
- Headquarters: Level 18 Tower D, International Waterfront Centre, 1 Wrightson Rd, Port of Spain, Trinidad
- Parent agency: CreativeTT, Ministry of Trade and Industry of Trinidad and Tobago
- Website: http://www.filmtt.co.tt/

The Trinidad & Tobago Film Company Limited (FilmTT) is the state agency established in 2006 to facilitate the growth and development of the film and audio-visual sector in Trinidad & Tobago. As a subsidiary of the Trinidad and Tobago Creative Industries Company Limited, FilmTT works on all aspects of film sector development, promotes Trinidad & Tobago as a film production location, and provides Film Commission services to local and incoming productions. FilmTT's mission is to maximise the economic and creative potential of Trinidad and Tobago's screen industries for the benefit of the country and its people.

FilmTT, along with MusicTT and FashionTT, are sub-companies of CreativeTT; collectively, the group reports to the Ministry of Trade and Industry and is charged with the sustainable development of the creative sector in Trinidad & Tobago.

As the country's Film Commission, FilmTT promotes Trinidad & Tobago as a location to attract productions to shoot there, and provides services to local and international producers. These are the services that FilmTT offers:

  - Arrange for smooth entry of equipment, cast and crew into the country for all productions.
  - Connect international producers to local production companies to set up production logistics on the ground on their behalf.
  - Provide production support services to local producers, including endorsement letters.
  - Increase overall ease for productions by building a network of agencies in Trinidad and Tobago committed to making the country more “film friendly”.
  - Manage production incentives, primarily the Production Expenditure Rebate Programme, which offers up to 35% cash back on services, and 20% cash back for hiring local labour.
  - Champion the film industry's potential to diversify the economy and contribute to GDP to Government, investors, service suppliers, local and international partner agencies, and industry stakeholders.

FilmTT came under the purview of the Trinidad and Tobago Creative Industries Company in 2013.

== Film Commission Services ==
=== Industry Liaison ===
FilmTT is responsible for coordinating the necessary permits for crews to film. As a state agency, FilmTT organizes with various ministries within the government for clearance for various aspects of the production process.

=== Location Scouting ===
FilmTT researches and proposes a range of locations in and around Trinidad and Tobago to production crews for filming. The agency executes the legal negotiations involved in the acquisition of locations for filming.

== Projects/Initiatives ==
=== Producers Talk ===
The inaugural installment of Producers Talk facilitated a conversation between FilmTT and the producers of the last three feature films in which the film company invested both grant and equity funds – Moving Parts (2018) by Emilie Upczak, Play the Devil (2016) by Maria Govan (represented by producer Abigail Hadeed), and The Cutlass (2016) by Darisha Beresford (represented by producer Teneille Newallo). The intention was for the first-time producers to share information about their experiences producing these films with an audience of other producers, directors, production crew, and other members of the film producing community.

Topics included sales and distribution, exhibition, filming in Trinidad and Tobago and funding, among others.

=== Secondary School Short Film Festival ===
The Trinidad and Tobago Secondary Schools Short Film Festival was founded by MovieTowne and passed on to The Trinidad and Tobago Film Company Ltd (FilmTT) in 2010. Winning films are shown at the Trinidad and Tobago Film Festival annually and winning schools awarded with high-tech equipment to sustain their film programs and productions.

=== Smartphone Film Festival ===
The national Smartphone Film Festival was launched in 2013. The competition which invites amateur filmmakers from Trinidad and Tobago to film mini-movies using only smartphone/mobile technology has no age limit. These short films must be no longer than 5 minutes in duration. The winner of the 2015 Smartphone Film Festival, Ayesha Jordan, had her film, “Good Ole Days” submitted into the 2016 Toronto Smartphone Film Festival.

=== Film Festival Season ===
Film Festival Season is an annual film industry event that occurs from September – November when Trinidad and Tobago's three major film festivals take place - Trinidad+Tobago film festival (ttff), Animae Caribe Animation and Digital Media Festival and Green Screen Environmental Film Festival. In 2018, the season runs from 4 September to 30 November.

For FilmTT, strategically investing in film festivals is one direct way of facilitating industry development, through structured, well-managed partnerships, while encouraging T&T's mass audience's growing tastes for more indigenous content. As a strategic marketing communications campaign, Film Festival Season seeks to not only create greater awareness of the activities taking place within the film and animation sectors, but also to create a sense of anticipation and pride in local creative products.

=== Small Marketing and Development Grants ===
In May 2017, FilmTT awarded small Film Marketing and Development Grants to nine T&T filmmakers to advance their productions and careers. These grants are investments in the marketing and development of projects, including (but not limited to) attending regional or international film festivals, markets, incubators, labs or workshops. All projects will take place during the period May 1 – December 31, 2017. Based on evaluation, the following projects were selected to receive Government funding:

- Michael Mooleedhar - social media marketing for his upcoming feature-length film Green Days By The River
- Leslie-Ann Wills-Caton – marketing of FIXERtales, a Trini-Caribbean television series
- Abigail Hadeed – inclusion of Spanish and French subtitles in Play the Devil for distribution to foreign audiences
- Lesley-Ann MacFarlane – production of 60 sec. sizzle reel for new feature film Scattered
- Tenielle Newallo – social media marketing for The Cutlass
- Everard McBain – online and international distribution for the animated short Celflux Reluctant Heroes: The Secret Weapon
- Mariel Brown – production of a trailer for the feature-length film Unfinished Sentences
- Clarence Carver Bacchus – attend the CaribbeanTales International Film Festival to seek distribution agreements for the Green Screen's library of content
- Christopher Din Chong - attend ScriptFest 2017 and take part in the Great American Pitchfest including masterclass, one-on-one meetings and consultations for his slate of films

The Open Call, held in March 2017, was available for application to residing nationals or permanent residents of Trinidad and Tobago with at least three film credits for three different productions. Nneka Luke, General Manager of FilmTT, said that the call is an opportunity for the company to invest directly in active film projects in a targeted and sustainable way.
