= Phil Cleary (businessman) =

Trinidad and Tobago businessman

Phil Cleary is one of the pioneers of the cable television industry in Trinidad and Tobago. He is originally from the province of Newfoundland, Canada. He migrated to Trinidad and Tobago in 1992 after a friend of Cleary had acquired a cable TV license in the twin island nation and was seeking a business partner. Following this, Transcable was born at Tacarigua spanning the Eastern Trinidad area from El Dorado up to Tacarigua.

In 1997 Cleary sold a part of his company to a United States-based investor and the company became renamed as Intercomm Holdings. Intercomm would then later purchase the competing Cableview and AJ Cable under Cleary's management.

== See also ==
- Cable Company of Trinidad and Tobago
