= Trinidad and Tobago Music Company =

MusicTT

Agency overview
- Formed: 2014; 12 years ago
- Jurisdiction: Republic of Trinidad and Tobago
- Headquarters: Export House, 151B Charlotte Street, Port of Spain, Trinidad
- Parent agency: CreativeTT, Ministry of Trade and Industry of Trinidad and Tobago
- Website: http://www.musictt.co.tt/

The Trinidad and Tobago Music Company Limited (MusicTT) was established in 2014. As a subsidiary of Trinidad and Tobago Creative Industries Company Limited (CreativeTT), MusicTT's mandate is "to stimulate and facilitate the business development and export activity of the music industry in Trinidad and Tobago to generate national wealth." As such, MusicTT provides industry-wide strategic and action plans toward the development of the music industry as well as guidance and access to music education and capacity development.

== MusicTT and economic diversification ==
The government has identified the music industry as one of three pioneering sectors that are pivotal to long-term economic sustainability because of dropping prices of oil and gas, Trinidad and Tobago's main export. The other two sectors identified for development are fashion and film. To permanently implant T&T's musical talents in international circles, MusicTT has established an online music showcase featuring local artists. This showcase promotes and exposes the world to Trinbagonian musical creativity.

== Projects/Initiatives ==
=== Feel the Beat Music Symposium ===
MusicTT hosted a music symposium titled FEEL THE BEAT (FTB) featuring multi-platinum recording producer Salaam Remi. This symposium provided participants with information on music production at both local and international levels, creating and exploiting opportunities in the music business ecosystem to better equip individuals aspiring to make music and/or its derivative industries a full-time lucrative career.

This symposium took place on Thursday 27 September 2018, Central Bank Auditorium, Port of Spain.

=== Live Music District ===
Live music is a fundamental pillar of the global music industry. Locally, as per MusicTT's survey results in 2017, access to music performance spaces was seen to be a major issue for music creatives, most of whom work a full-time job parallel to their musical activities. Additionally, there has been a challenge for local music performers outside of the indigenous carnival-oriented genres to book performances year-round. Internationally, the designation of creative, cultural and entertainment districts attracts visitors and therefore creates opportunities for jobs and revenue generation. It also promotes and assists in policing and regulating an area with a high concentration of businesses and activity from a particular sector. As such, the creation of a Live Music District is a key strategy being undertaken by MusicTT through the Ministry of Trade and Industry in order to address the challenges presented by the majority of stakeholders.

MusicTT has identified the City of Port of Spain as the first Live Music District for Trinidad & Tobago. The main areas within the City that were targeted included the heart of Port of Spain, The Botanic Gardens, Ariapita Avenue, as well as the surrounding hotels, restaurants, squares and other bustling areas. These areas were chosen due to the already-present infrastructure suited for live music as well as the existence of a solid customer base who currently frequent these areas.

The Live Music District was launched in March 2018 and has since provided local artistes with opportunities to showcase their talent at various events and locations throughout the chosen Pilot in the Port of Spain district. Registered artistes have performed in venues such as Radisson Hotel, Hilton Hotel, Smokey and Bunty, Kaiso Blues Café, Xperience Event Centre, D’Bocas and the Rizzoni's to name a few, as well as signature events such as Live at the Gardens and Live on the Avenue.

Phase 2 will commence on Sunday 21 October 2018 with Live at Fiesta Plaza and continue until December 2018.

=== The Artist Portfolio Development Programme (APDP) ===
As an export initiative, the APDP focuses on those artists who are evaluated to be on the cusp of export-readiness but need specific capacity development in areas such as music business and entertainment law training, brand and artist development, pitching strategies, developing business and marketing plans, developing robust online presence, monetizing music IP, etc. All training will be done through the Music Export Academy (explained below). This is a yearly initiative, with cohorts for each year being transparently chosen by international, independent industry executives at a public music showcase.

The Music Showcase is the first phase of the Artist Portfolio Development Programme (APDP). Local singers/songwriters, duos and bands of all genres performed before a live audience and a panel of international, independent industry executives for a chance to become part of the cohort for the Music Export Academy.

The event took place on Saturday 9 December at Tzar, Ariapita Avenue.

=== Music Export Academy ===
As a part of the Artist Portfolio Development Programme, this Academy will train the cohort in the exact knowledge and skills they need to export their music products. This may possibly include training, consultations and workshops as per the needs of the participants. Some of the wider sessions will also be open to other suitable music creatives. The 11 artists advancing from the Showcase to become the first Music Export Academy cohort are Chinaka, Shannon Francois, Candice Caton, Miss Renuka, Daniel Griffith, DEZii, X-A-Vier & Black Unity, Donald Job, Quattro Musica, VoiceQueen and Keoné.

=== Songwriting and Production Camp ===
MusicTT's Song Writing and Production Workshop gave Trinidad and Tobago's creative practitioners access to international markets and the opportunity to build capacity to an international standard. Participants obtained knowledge of international best practices in an interactive, hands-on workshop while familiarizing international music industry professionals with up and coming Trinidad and Tobago artistes, songwriters and producers. Entertainment Management Quarters Limited led by their CEO Mr. Simon Baptiste was awarded the tender for the Provision of the Design, Facilitation and Delivery of an Advanced Song Writing and Production Camp. They contracted Grammy-nominated team Weirdo Workshop, inclusive of CEO/songwriter/vocalist Claude Kelly, co-CEO/producer/musician Chuck Harmony as well as their sound engineer Michael Piazza and their creative director Evan Vogul. Weirdo Workshop gave an assignment of producing a song which will be submitted for potential placement in commercials, movies or for a signed artiste.

=== Music Publishing Camp ===
Held in 2015, this workshop educated participants on the functions of a music publisher, the income sources possible for a song (inclusive of getting songs into commercials, movies/films and to signed artists), the art of intellectual property exploitation and licensing, collaborations and remixes, song quality checklists, the role of performing rights organizations in publishing and access to the international music industry. Facilitators for this workshop include Marcus Spence, Senior Vice President A&R, Mosley Music Group LLC; Sean Mulligan, Vice President, Film, TV & Media, Rock Steady Music; Vivian Barclay, General Manager, Warner Chappell Music Publishing and Jennifer Beavis, Director Publishing, Copyright & Royalty Administration, BMG Chrysalis.

=== Music IP Valuation Workshop ===
This workshop explored the basic concepts of how to protect intellectual property and methods used in the valuation of intellectual property with regards to music, and the true collateral value of a song and its artist(s) when approaching investors. The feature speaker was entertainment attorney, Carla Parris, who has operated as a consultant for World Intellectual Property Organisation (WIPO) projects and participated in over twelve local and regional conferences in the areas of Intellectual Property law and the creative sector. Heather Baldwin-Mc Dowell, Intellectual Property and Public Relations Practitioner, was a guest speaker.

General Manager of MusicTT, Jeanelle Frontin, emphasized the pressing need for this workshop. "There are two major challenges that must be overcome locally: firstly, there needs to be a cultural shift towards valuing the written word over the spoken word and secondly, people need to intimately get to know what they don't know about their intellectual property rights. Why? Because the majority of music revenue can only be accessed through the leveraging of those IP rights, and half the battle is having those rights put down in black-and-white," Frontin explained.

=== Songwriting, Production, Mixing and Mastering Workshop ===
This four-day workshop covered the four important elements within the music industry.

- Songwriting - the basics of songwriting (from melody to lyrics to arrangement); tips for demos; how to collaborate; tips for getting your songs heard and placed; understanding publishing deals.
- Production – importance of the type of equipment being used; how to create your song structure (layout and drops); basics of production; how to set up your studio; how to craft what an artist needs.
- Mixing – the basics of being an audio engineer and the daily routine; the anatomy of a great mix; Pro Tools routing; how to communicate with clients; how to market and brand yourself as a music professional.
- Mastering - understanding of the tools and techniques involved in mastering for electronic productions of all kinds; business knowledge for electronic music producers, self-producing artists, composers for visuals, songwriters, engineers, producers, and hobbyists.

Facilitators included Michelle Bell, Singer-songwriter and Record Producer, Kobalt Music Group; 88-Keys, Grammy Award-winning producer, Keys Open Doors LLC; Dana Shayegan, Vice President of Music at the premium content network, Studio71; IRKO, Multi-platinum Award-winning audio engineer, Audio Nutrition LLC and Jeremy Harding, 2 Hard Studios.

=== Open call for proposals ===
In 2015, music industry stakeholders were invited biannually to submit proposals that fit into any of the following categories: build capacity for individual local music stakeholders; build community/capacity of the entire Trinidad and Tobago music ecosystem or facilitate international exposure of local music stakeholders. There were two other Open Call for Proposals in January and July/August 2017.

=== The Business of Calypso Workshop featuring Calypso Rose ===
MusicTT, in collaboration with the Ministry of Trade and Industry and TUCO, hosted The Business of Calypso Workshop featuring Calypso Rose on Friday 17 February 2017 at the NAPA Restaurant, Port of Spain. The workshop's agenda included several panel discussions featuring notable industry practitioners such as Carl 'Beaver' Henderson, Robert Amar, Richard Ahong, Jean Michel Gilbert, Anne Marie Omed Joseph and Fabien Alonso who shared their knowledge, opinions and advice to stimulate thought-provoking discussions on the essentials in composing calypso, calypso music production and music business, finance and marketing.

=== How to Make a Living from Music Workshop ===
The How to Make a Living from Music workshop is a MusicTT initiative coordinated by the World Intellectual Property Organization (WIPO) in collaboration with the Intellectual Property Office of Trinidad and Tobago (IPO). It aims to educate music practitioners on the essentials of artist management, branding, intellectual property and monetizing their music products through various income streams. This workshop took place on 6–7 April 2017 at the Cascadia Hotel, St. Anns.
