= List of airlines of Trinidad and Tobago =

This is a list of airlines which have an air operator's certificate issued by the Civil Aviation Authority of Trinidad and Tobago.

Airline	Image	IATA	ICAO	Callsign	Hub airport(s)	Commenced operations	Notes
Caribbean Airlines		BW	BWA	CARIBBEAN AIRLINES	Piarco International Airport	2006	National airline

== Defunct airlines ==
This is a list of defunct airlines of Trinidad and Tobago.

Airline	Image	IATA	ICAO	Callsign	Commenced operations	Ceased operations	Notes
Air Caribbean		C2	CBB	IBIS	1993	2000	
Arawak Airlines		LK			1970	1973	Renamed to Caribbean United Airlines
Beach Airways					1973	1973	
BWIA West Indies Airways		BW	BWA	WEST INDIAN	1939	2006	Rebranded as Caribbean Airlines
Caribbean United Airlines					1973	1974	
Constellation West Indian Airways					2007	2008	
Tobago Express		BW	TBX	TABEX	2001	2007	Merged into Caribbean Airlines
Trinidad and Tobago Air Services		HU			1974	1980	Merged with British West Indian Airlines

== See also ==
- List of airlines
- List of airports in Trinidad and Tobago
