= Mario's Pizzeria =

Pizza restaurant chain in Trinidad and Tobago

Mario's Pizza
- The Pizza King
- Type: Restaurant
- Industry: Fast Food
- Founded: June 2, 1972; 54 years ago (Valpark Shopping Plaza, Valsayn)
- Headquarters: El Socorro, Trinidad and Tobago
- Number of locations: 22 restaurants
- Key people: Richard Harford, Roger Harford, James Gajadhar
- Products: Pizza, Sandwiches, Burgers
- Number of employees: 400-500
- Parent: Mario's Pizzeria Limited
- Website: mymarios.com

Mario's Pizzeria is a pizza restaurant chain in Trinidad and Tobago.

Mario's started operations in June 1972 as a sandwich deli at the Valpark Shopping Plaza. It was launched by Richard Harford and Roger Gibbon. After launching, they were convinced by three other friends to turn the sandwich shop into a pizza parlour, the first in the country. Over the years, Richard Harford bought back his partners' shares. It opened its first restaurant in Guyana in 2005.

Mario's Pizzeria operates twenty-one pizza restaurants in Trinidad, plus five stores in Guyana. According to the company's direction, Mario's Pizzeria holds a 50% share on the pizza market in the country.
