= K.C. Confectionery Limited =

- Company type: Private
- Industry: Food
- Founded: Couva - 1922
- Founder: Ibrahim Khan
- Headquarters: Couva, Couva–Tabaquite–Talparo, Trinidad
- Website: kccandy.com

K.C. Confectionery Limited is one of the largest confectioners in the Caribbean region. Founded in 1922 by Ibrahim Khan as a cottage industry and developed as a factory in 1957, but it was fully automated in the early 1990s. Today 65% of the goods are exported. The main Foreign Markets of this company are targeted in the United States, Canada, the United Kingdom, Antigua and Barbuda, Bahamas, Barbados, Belize, Dominican Republic, Dominica, Grenada and Carriacou, Guyana, St Kitts and Nevis, Anguilla, St Lucia, St Vincent and the Grenadines, Jamaica, Suriname, British Virgin Islands, Curacao, Aruba and Guadeloupe.

== Locations ==
K.C. Confectionery headquarters are in Trinidad and Tobago, at Couva.

== Products manufactured and distributed by K.C. Candy ==
=== Gum ===
- Cosmic II
- Cosmic Gumballs (Gumballes de Cosmic)
- Cricket Gumballs
- Football Gum
- Ice Blass
- Jalapeño
- Sour Face
- Speckled Egg
- Pumpkin
- Watermelon

=== Hard candy ===
- Choco Fill Mints
- Chocolate Centre
- Clear Mints
- Dinner Mint
- Fruit Fantasy
- Ginger Mint
- Ice Mint
- Mango Chilli
- Menthol Drop
- Menthol Drop Light
- Super Mint
- After Dinner Mints

=== Lollipops ===
- Frenzi pop
- Gumbo Pops
- Red Tongue Pops
- Tamarind Pops
- Peanut Pops
- Guava Pops

=== Mixtures ===
- Fun Mix
- Kiddy Candy
- Trini Mints

=== Toffees and chews ===
- Creamy Toffees
- Fruit Chews
- Orange Quality Toffees
- Strawberry Quality Toffees
- Strongman Toffee

=== Bar ===
- Butter Nut
