= TruValu Supermarket =

Supermarket chain in Trinidad and Tobago

- Type: subsidiary
- Industry: Retail (Grocery)
- Headquarters: Trinidad and Tobago

TruValu Supermarket is a nationwide and one of the largest supermarket chains in Trinidad and Tobago. Eastern Commercial Lands trading as TruValu Supermarket. TruValu was established in 1978 and providing a wide variety of local and international products. They have five stores located in Diego Martin, Long Circular Mall, San Juan, Trincity and Valpark Plaza. The company is owned by Home Construction Ltd a subsidiary of CL Financial. TruValu was put up for a court approved sale in January 2025 by Grant Thornton who are the liquidators for CL Financial.
