= Willies Ice Cream =

Trinidadian ice cream company

Willies Ice Cream is a homemade ice cream company in central Trinidad and Tobago. It was founded in 1986 by Wilbur "Willie" Balgobin in Chaguanas. It is one of the largest in Trinidad and is exported throughout the Caribbean and North America.

The ice cream is made using the batch process and does not contain any artificial ingredients. Being produced with natural flavours including the tropical flavors of coconut, mango, soursop.

The ice cream has been quoted as being considered "super premium".

On July 3, 2014, founder Wilber Balgobin died.
