= Rhyners Record Shop =

Music store in Trinidad and Tobago

Rhyners Record Shop is a music store in Trinidad and Tobago. It was founded in 1938 by Hilton Rhyner, who ran the store until his death in 1981. It is now run by his daughters Yvonne and Diana Rhyner. It was originally located at 54 Prince Street in Port of Spain until it closed 2006, and is now located at Piarco Airport duty-free shop, in Diego Martin, and online. It sells calypso, soca, pop, reggae, and vintage oldies in vinyl record, cassette tape, CD, VHS, and DVD format.
