= Cable Company of Trinidad and Tobago =

Cable TV and broadband provider in Trinidad and Tobago

The Cable Company of Trinidad and Tobago (CCTT) or the Trinidad & Tobago Trans-Cable Co. Ltd, a division of Intercomm Holdings (Trinidad), is a Cable TV and broadband provider in Trinidad and Tobago. It was formed by a merger of the local companies Transcable, Cable View, Rainbow and AJ Cable, and competes against DirecTV, TSTT, and several other local Internet service providers in Trinidad and Tobago. Phil Cleary, a businessman originally from Newfoundland, Canada founded the company.

The broadband offerings provided by CCTT go by the name FiberLine. The FiberLine network is made up of a composite high-speed fiber-optic Internet backbone distributed over much of the interior of Trinidad. As DirecTV is not licensed to provide an Internet service via satellite in Trinidad and Tobago, FiberLine and TSTT are its sole high-speed Internet providers.

Scientific Atlanta digital cable boxes were provided to all customers in 1999 and 2000, after which the company tried to implement tiered service packages. But many customers returned their boxes, saying that they were randomly scrambling basic cable channels. Despite continued efforts customers still complain of occasional outages during international cricket matches.

In 2006, the company was acquired by a Canadian company, and changed its name to Columbus Communications.
