= Michael Mooleedhar =

Trinidadian director and producer

- Born: 3 August 1985 (age 40); Port of Spain, Trinidad and Tobago
- Occupation(s): Film director, film producer
- Years active: 2008–present
- Notable work: Green Days By The River

Michael Mooleedhar (born 3 August 1985) is a Trinidadian director and producer whose work includes documentaries, music videos, and film. His first feature film, Green Days By The River, opened the Trinidad and Tobago Film Festival in 2017. Winning People's Choice Award for best Feature Film Narrative and Best Trinidad and Tobago Feature Film 2017.

Mooleedhar’s directorial debut, Queens Of Curepe (2008), is a revealing documentary focusing on transsexual sex workers from Trinidad and Tobago and other territories in the Caribbean who work in the streets of Curepe, a town found along Trinidad and Tobago’s East-West Corridor.

== Early life and education ==
Michael Kenneth Mooleedhar was born on 3 August 1985 in Port of Spain, Trinidad and Tobago, the son of Carol Mooleedhar (née Brewster), a librarian, and Timothy Mooleedhar, a city planner. He grew up in the Trincity neighborhood before moving to Glencoe and graduated from Saint Mary's College (CIC) in 2006.

Mooleedhar attended the University of West Indies, Saint Augustine campus, earning a Bachelor of Arts degree (BA) in Film in 2009 and a Master of Arts degree (MA) in Creative Design Entrepreneurship in 2012.

== Career ==
Mooleedhar's first film, Queens Of Curepe (2008), was a critically acclaimed documentary that shone light on the world of sex workers in Trinidad and Tobago. The film was also met with concerns from Trinidad and Tobago’s Family Planning Association due to its content; however, Mooleedhar was able to work with the organization and allowed them to use the film for advocacy purposes. The FPA subsequently hired him to do additional projects for them.

In 2009 he met his mentor and future collaborator, Professor Patricia Mohammed, and they worked together on Mohammed’s next project, Coolie Pink and Green (2009), for which Mooleedhar served as co-producer and editor. The film won the People’s Choice Award at the 2009 Trinidad and Tobago Film Festival.

In 2010, Mooleedhar and Mohammed came together again to work on Seventeen Colors and a Sitar, featuring Rex Dixon and Mungal Patasar, with Mooleedhar co-directing.

Mooleedhar’s narrative short film The Cool Boys (2012) is an exploration of a young man’s take on the reality around him and his attempt at expressing how he experiences life at this time.

Mooleedhar returned to documentary film with City On The Hill (2015), this time exploring the region of Laventille in Trinidad and Tobago’s East Port of Spain. The documentary was praised for its understatement of the violence for which this neighborhood is generally known.

Mooleedhar's feature film directorial debut came in 2017 with Green Days By The River, an adaptation of the classic Trinidadian novel of the same name by celebrated author Michael Anthony that opened the 2017 Trinidad and Tobago Film Festival.

== Filmography ==
=== Film ===
- Green Days By The River (2017)
- City On The Hill (2015) - Documentary Short co-directed with Professor Patricia Mohammed
- The Cool Boys (2012) - Short
- Seventeen Colors and a Sitar (2010) - co-directed with Professor Patricia Mohammed
- Coolie Pink and Green (2009) - co-producer with Professor Patricia Mohammed and Editor
- Queens Of Curepe (2008) - Documentary

=== Music Videos ===
- Tennille Amor feat. Bunji Garlin – I Want Your Love
- Mark Hardy x Yung Rudd – Wuz D Scene w/ Justyn Mayers
- Stef Kalloo x Mark Hardy – Dan It Up

== Awards and recognition ==
- University of the West Indies - Impact Award 2008
- Trinidad and Tobago Film Festival 2009 - People’s Choice Award for Coolie Pink & Green
- Trinidad and Tobago Film Festival 2015 - People’s Choice Award for City On The Hill
- Trinidad and Tobago Film Festival 2017 - Best Trinidad and Tobago Feature Film for Green Days by the River
- Trinidad and Tobago Film Festival 2017 - People's Choice Award best Feature Film Narrative for Green Days by the River
- Barbados Independent Film Festival 2018- Carmichael Award for Exceptional storytelling for Green Days by the River
