= MovieTowne =

Caribbean cinema chain

- Company type: Cinema chain
- Founded: 2002
- Headquarters: Lot D, MovieTowne Boulevard, Audrey Jeffers Highway Port of Spain, Republic of Trinidad and Tobago
- Key people: Derek Chin (CEO)
- Number of employees: 300
- Website: MovieTowne.com

MovieTowne is a privately owned Multiplex cinema chain in Trinidad and Tobago and Guyana, headquartered in Port of Spain. It is the largest cinema chain in Trinidad and Tobago with two locations in the former (Port of Spain, San Fernando). Its latest cineplex opened in Georgetown, Guyana in 2019, the company's first outside of Trinidad and Tobago.

== History ==
MovieTowne was founded in November 2002 by Trinidadian entrepreneur Derek Chin, with support from businessmen Ernesto Abraham, Pierpont Scott and Winfield Scott, all of whom now sit on the company's board.

In January 2026 the company closed its Tobago location due to economic difficulties.

== Structure ==
Most MovieTowne complexes contain shopping and dining facilities, the latter often being multinational food chains.

== Expansion ==
In 2013, work began in one of Guyana's fastest growing urban areas, known as Turkeyen, with MovieTowne having been scheduled to open in 2017. The project is estimated to cost $45 Million US and is expected to create between 500 - 800 new job opportunities. MovieTowne Guyana will accommodate 200,000 sq. ft. of retail, dining and entertainment space with 1800 cinema seats in eight screens. Massy Stores, Trinidad’s leading supermarket chain will be one of the retail shops in MovieTowne Guyana.
