= Green Days by the River =

Green Days By The River
- Theatrical release poster
- Directed by: Michael Mooleedhar
- Screenplay by: Dawn Cumberbatch
- Based on: Green Days By The River by Michael Anthony
- Produced by: Christian James
- Starring: Sudai Tafari; Anand Lawkaran; Nadia Nisha Kandhai; Vanessa Bartholomew; Che Rodriguez
- Cinematography: Andressa Cor
- Music by: Laura Karpman
- Production company: Cedar Grove Films Studio 2One9
- Release dates: September 27, 2017 (Trinidad and Tobago)
- Running time: 102 minutes
- Country: Trinidad and Tobago
- Language: English

Green Days By The River is a 2017 Trinidadian drama film, directed by Michael Mooleedhar. It is based on the novel of the same name by the Trinidadian author Michael Anthony. Set in 1952 Trinidad, the film follows Shellie, an ambitious Afro-Trinidadian village boy struggling with poverty and his sick father. The latter finds solace in a wealthy Indo-Trinidadian farmer, Mr. Gidharee and his captivating daughter until he falls for a city girl, discovering the scheming entrapment of his solace shatters his love life and manhood. The film opened at the 2017 Trinidad and Tobago Film Festival.

== Cast ==
- Sudai Tafari - Shellie
- Anand Lawkaran- Mr. Gidharee
- Nadia Nisha Kandhai - Rosalie
- Vanessa Bartholomew - Joan
- Che Rodriguez - Pa Lammy
