= Air Caribbean (Trinidad and Tobago) =

Trinidadian airlines (1993-2000)

Air Caribbean Limited
| IATA | ICAO | Call sign |
|---|---|---|
| C2 | CBB | IBIS |
- Founded: 1993
- Commenced operations: 1993; 33 years ago
- Ceased operations: 23 October 2000
- Hubs: Piarco International Airport
- Fleet size: 8
- Destinations: 5
- Headquarters: Port of Spain, Trinidad and Tobago
- Key people: Leslie Lucky-Samaroo (chairman)

Air Caribbean was a Trinidadian airline operating between 1993 and 2000.

== History ==
The airline was based at Piarco International Airport and used YS-11 aircraft for the first five years. In March 1998 the airline purchased a Boeing 737-200 Advanced and announced Miami as a new destination. This aircraft had fuel-thirsty and noisy JT8D engines, and were a financial burden to the airline. The plane was too noisy for American noise regulations, delaying the Miami plans. Until mid-1999 the airline purchased two more 737-200s and announced further plans to fly to Caracas, New York, Orlando and Toronto. The problems with the US Department of Transport did not stop; one of the 737s was so old that a hush kit could not be fitted. As a consequence, the planes had to be grounded whilst the hush-kits were fitted to the suitable aircraft.

In early 2000, Air Caribbean offered slashed air fares to Miami, in order to compete with BWIA and American Airlines. This was a financial disaster, as passengers chose to fly with competing airlines who offered modern aircraft. On October 23, 2000, Air Caribbean was closed down, with massive debts. The 737s have since been scrapped in America, and one YS-11 is still at Piarco International Airport, in an abandoned state.

== Destinations ==
- Barbados
  - Grantley Adams International Airport
- Grenada
  - Maurice Bishop International Airport
- Guyana
  - Cheddi Jagan International Airport
- Trinidad and Tobago
  - Piarco International Airport
  - Arthur Napoleon Raymond Robinson International Airport
- United States
  - Miami International Airport

== Fleet ==
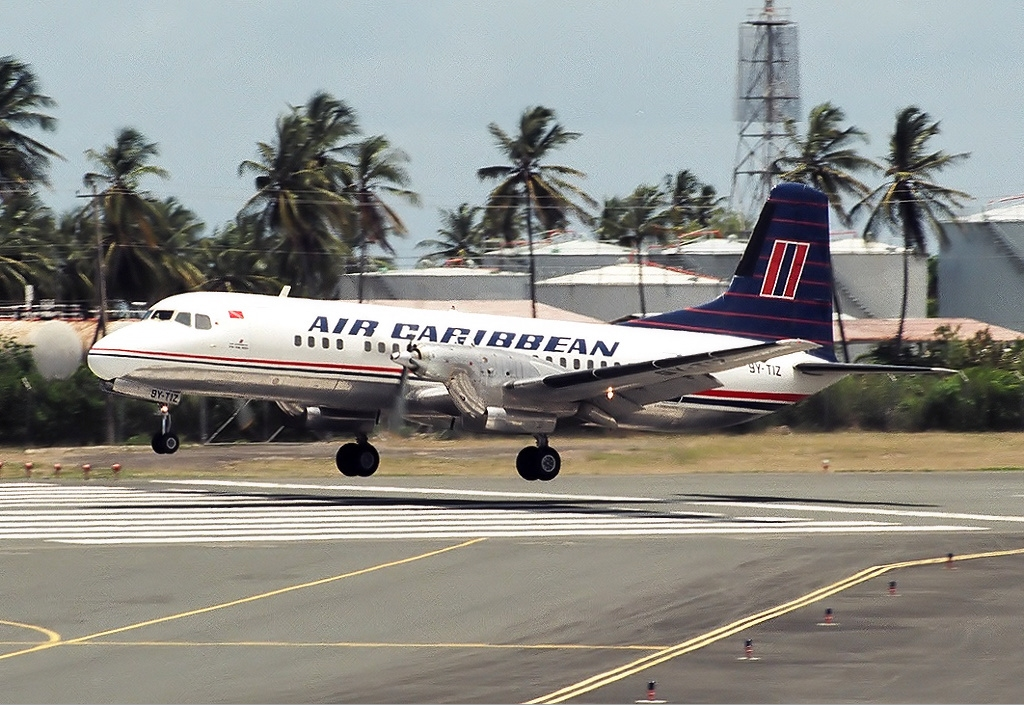
Air Caribbean YS-11 in 1999

The airline operated a fleet of six NAMC YS-11's and two Boeing 737-200 aircraft.

Air Caribbean cleet
| Aircraft | Total | Passengers | Haul |
|---|---|---|---|
| YS-11 | 6 | 64 | Short Haul |
| Boeing 737-200 | 3 | 136 | Short-Medium Haul |
