= Charney Report =

1979 report on global warming

Carbon Dioxide and Climate: A Scientific Assessment
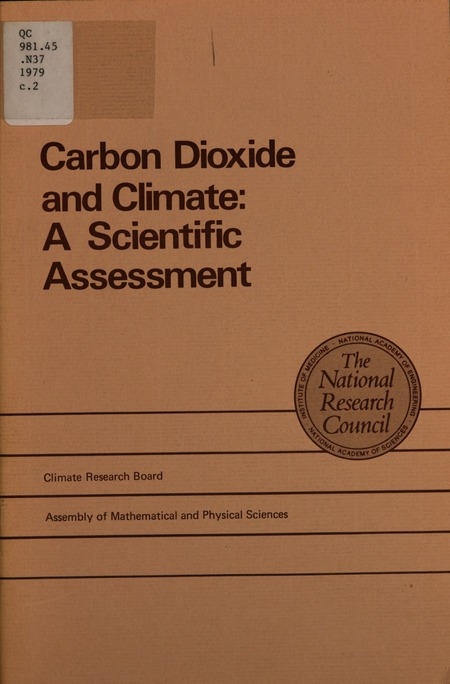
- Cover of the report
- Created: 1979; 46 years ago
- Commissioned by: National Academy of Sciences
- Authors: Jule Charney; Akio Arakawa; D. James Baker; Bert Bolin; Robert E. Dickinson; Richard M. Goody; Cecil Leith; Henry Stommel; Carl Wunsch

The Charney Report, formally titled Carbon Dioxide and Climate: A Scientific Assessment, is a scientific report published in 1979 that predicts global warming due to greenhouse gas emissions from human use of fossil fuels.

When early climate models predicted a rise in average surface temperatures, the White House asked the president of the National Academy of Sciences to assess their scientific robustness. Meteorologist Jule Charney was charged with this task and assembled eight renowned climate researchers.

They concluded that the model projections, particularly those of Syukuro Manabe and James E. Hansen, were consistent with scientific knowledge of the physical processes governing the climate system and indicated that humanity was changing the climate through the greenhouse effect. Despite advances in scientific knowledge, their estimated equilibrium climate sensitivity of 3 °C (±1.5 °C) has remained largely unchallenged - with only minor refinements - over the ensuing forty years.

The publication of the Charney Report is considered a milestone in the history of understanding climate change.

== Background ==
The mechanism of the greenhouse effect and the role of carbon dioxide (CO_{2}) as a greenhouse gas, particularly as emitted by humans by burning fossil fuels, have been known since the 19th century. By the mid-20th century, an increasing number of researchers predicted that anthropogenic greenhouse gas emissions would cause an increase in the average surface temperature of the atmosphere. In the 1950s, the work of Roger Revelle and Hans Suess established that the ocean was a smaller carbon sink than previously thought. In the following decade, the first results of Charles Keeling's measurements showed an increase in the atmospheric concentration of CO_{2} (the Keeling curve).

In 1975, Wallace Broecker popularized the term "global warming" in a Science article predicting unprecedented temperatures in the 21st century, based on the first digital climate models that appeared in the 1960s. Two years later, the National Academy of Sciences issued a widely publicized report, Energy and Climate, warning of warming in the 21st century that could reach an average of 6 °C by the end of the 22nd century due to fossil fuel use, and calling for more scientific research to reduce uncertainties.

In the 1970s, the scientific consensus recognized humanity's ability to affect the climate, and the scientific community increasingly focused on the possibility of global warming. However, there was no clear consensus on the warming, which was then imperceptible. The hypothesis of global cooling due to anthropogenic aerosol emissions was also circulating, including in the media, where Reid Bryson popularized it for the public.

Meanwhile, scientific climate research coincided with the rise of environmentalism - societal concern about human impact on the environment, especially in the United States. The 1970s also saw global droughts that led to famine and skyrocketing food prices, underscoring the importance of climate to agriculture. The decade was marked by the first oil shock, which led U.S. President Jimmy Carter to consider increasing domestic production of fossil fuels and to create the Department of Energy.

== Origins ==
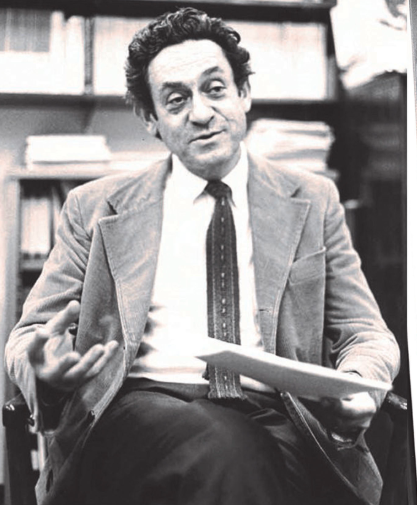
Jule Charney, Chairman of the Ad Hoc Study Group on Carbon Dioxide and Climate. Photograph taken in 1978.

In 1977, the United States Department of Energy prepared a CO_{2} research program and requested a report from the JASON Committee, a group of scientists advising the Department of Defense. Although the JASON members were not climatologists, they studied the effect of CO_{2} emissions on climate using a model they had developed to estimate equilibrium climate sensitivity or the amount of warming caused by a doubling of atmospheric CO_{2} concentrations relative to pre-industrial levels. They concluded that climate sensitivity is 2.4 °C, which could lead to negative economic and social consequences. This result was consistent with earlier estimates from general circulation models, and as science historians Naomi Oreskes and Erik M. Conway note, the political connections of the JASON committee members gave the report considerable authority.

One of the report's authors, Gordon MacDonald, along with environmental activist Rafe Pomerance, met with Jimmy Carter's science advisor and director of the Office of Science and Technology Policy, Frank Press, to present their findings. On May 22, 1979, Press wrote to National Academy of Sciences President Philip Handler requesting a study to determine the scientific reliability of climate models.

Handler asked Jule Charney, a renowned meteorologist and modeler at the Massachusetts Institute of Technology (MIT), to chair a working group on the issue. Charney brought together eight distinguished scientists to form the Ad Hoc Study Group on Carbon Dioxide and Climate: Akio Arakawa, D. James Baker, Bert Bolin, Robert E. Dickinson, Richard M. Goody, Cecil Leith, Henry Stommel, and Carl Wunsch.

== Development and conclusions ==
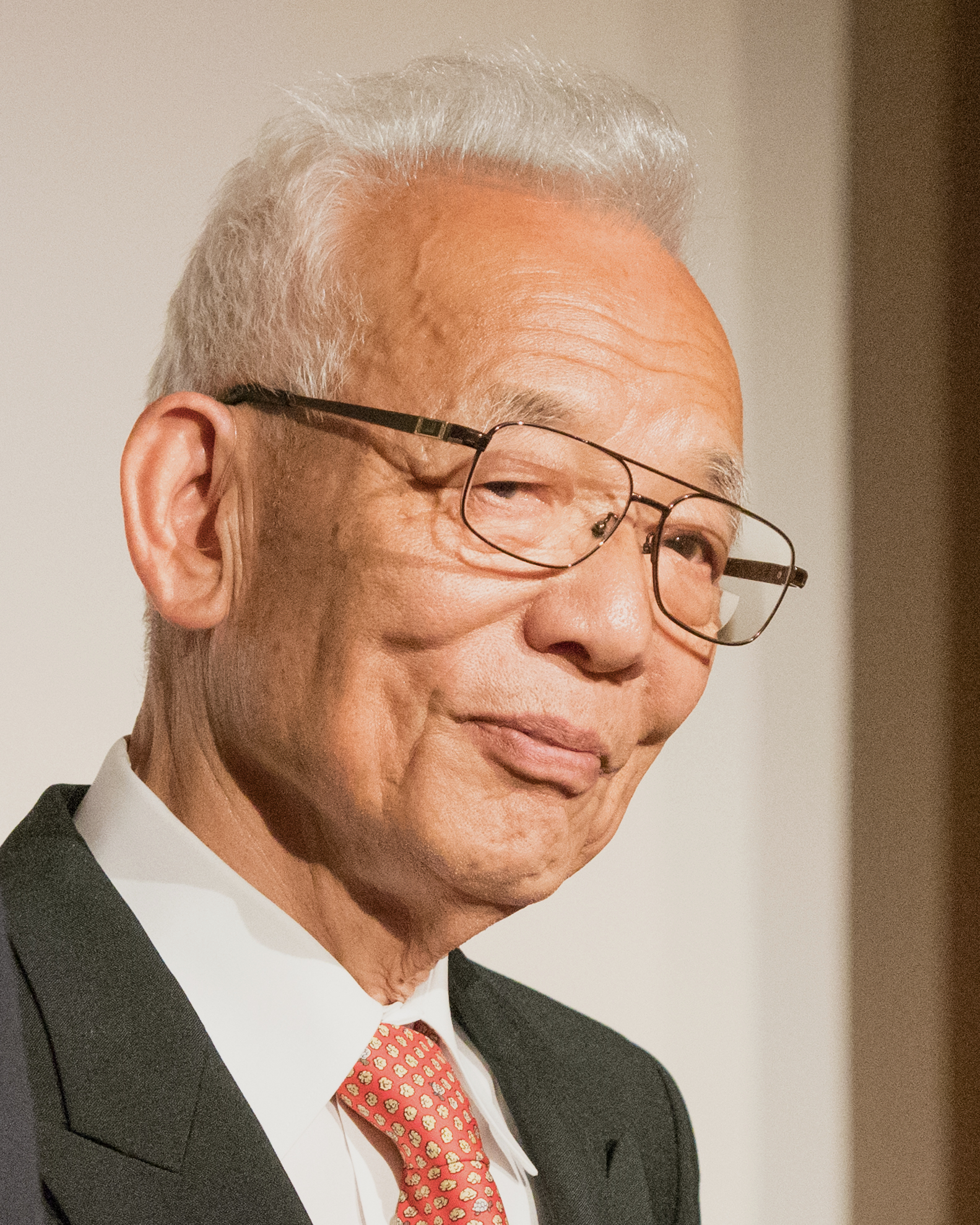
Syukuro Manabe (2018)

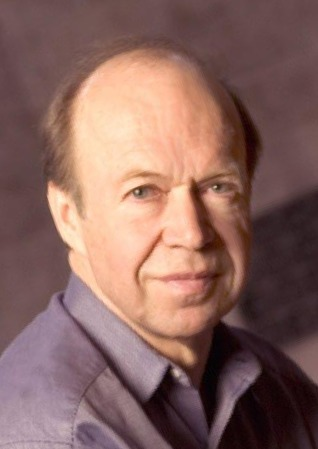
James E. Hansen (2005)

The two main climate modellers in 1979, whose work was analysed by the researchers gathered at Woods Hole.

On July 23, 1979, the nine scientists, accompanied by their families, met in Woods Hole on the Massachusetts coast, where the National Academy of Sciences has a conference center. Also present as observers were members of various federal agencies and staff of the National Research Council, who oversaw the report development. After working together in Woods Hole from July 23 to July 27, and continuing to exchange ideas in the following weeks, the group produced a 22-page report entitled Carbon Dioxide and Climate: A Scientific Assessment.

Jule Charney decided to evaluate not only the JASON committee's model but also the more advanced three-dimensional general circulation models of Syukuro Manabe (from NOAA's Geophysical Fluid Dynamics Laboratory) and James E. Hansen (from NASA's Goddard Institute for Space Studies). The first model estimated equilibrium climate sensitivity between 2 °C and 3 °C, while the second model estimated values close to 4 °C. Both researchers were invited to present how their models worked, and the difference in their estimates was largely due to different approaches to modeling certain physical processes, such as the positive feedback loop triggered by melting ice (decreasing albedo).

All models, by definition, simplify the complex physics of climate, and uncertainties remain, for example, about the dominant feedback effect of clouds (depending on their altitude) or the interactions between the ocean surface layer and the thermocline. The researchers, led by Jule Charney, therefore examined all possible negative feedback loops that could counteract the greenhouse warming predicted by the models in the presence of increased atmospheric CO_{2} concentrations. As they wrote in the report: "[We] have concluded that the oversimplifications and inaccuracies in the models are not likely to have vitiated the principal conclusion that there will be appreciable warming." The document thus concludes with an estimated equilibrium climate sensitivity of 3 °C, with a margin of error of ±1.5 °C (i.e., from 1.5 °C to 4.5 °C). The authors also point out - and this prediction later proved accurate - that the ocean's heat absorption capacity could delay noticeable atmospheric warming by several decades for a given level of CO_{2} emissions: "We may not be given a warning until the CO2 loading is such that an appreciable climate change is inevitable."

== Legacy ==
The conclusions of the Charney Report have since been confirmed by new instrumental data sets, comparisons with past climates, and more sophisticated computer models. In particular, the range of error estimated in the report for equilibrium climate sensitivity (1.5 °C to 4.5 °C) is consistent with that evaluated in the IPCC Fifth Assessment Report, with the central value (3 °C) consistent with the IPCC Sixth Assessment Report (2021), which concluded with a narrower range of error.

The Charney Report did not introduce new scientific knowledge about climate change, but it did reaffirm the scientific robustness of climate models, based on a solid understanding of physical processes, and demonstrated a growing scientific consensus about future warming. However, knowledge about climate change remained theoretical, and not all researchers were convinced by the computer models. The first tangible evidence of warming came a decade later, with Jean Jouzel and Claude Lorius' reconstructions of past climates using Antarctic ice cores.

The Charney Report, published in 1979, was covered by Science under the headline CO_{2} in Climate: Doomsday Predictions Have No Faults. The report circulated in scientific and business circles but did not lead to political action to reduce greenhouse gas emissions.

The year 1979 is considered a landmark in the history of knowledge about human-caused climate change because of the publication of the report and the simultaneous organization of the first World Climate Conference by the World Meteorological Organization (WMO). It preceded by nine years the creation of the Intergovernmental Panel on Climate Change (IPCC), an initiative led by Bert Bolin, one of the authors of the Charney Report.

== See also ==
- Climate change
- Climate sensitivity
- General circulation model
- Merchants of Doubt
- Senate Hearing of James E. Hansen (1988)

== Bibliography ==
- Charney, Jule; Arakawa, Akio; Baker, D. James; Bolin, Bert; Dickinson, Robert E; Goody, Richard M; Leith, Cecil; Stommel, Henry; Wunsch, Carl (1979). Carbon Dioxide and Climate : A Scientific Assessment. National Academies Press. doi:10.17226/12181. ISBN 978-0-309-11910-8. Archived from the original on April 24, 2024.
