= Kin's Farm Market =

Canadian supermarket chain

- Founded: 1983; 43 years ago
- Founders: Kin Wah and Kin Hun Leung
- Headquarters: Richmond, British Columbia
- Number of locations: 29 (2019)
- Area served: British Columbia
- Website: kinsfarmmarket.com

Kin's Farm Market is a Canadian-owned chain of retail produce outlets. As of 2019, the company operates 29 stores across British Columbia. The stores sell fresh produce from local farms, as well as imported fruit and vegetables from around the world.

== History ==
Kin's Farm Market was founded in 1983 by Kin Wah and Kin Hun Leung, who were at the time recent graduates of Vancouver Community College, at an eight-foot table at the Granville Island market in Vancouver, British Columbia. Four years later, they opened their first retail location at Blundell Centre in Richmond, British Columbia, naming it Kin's Farm Market. Three years later, they opened a second store. By 2001, Kin's had opened a total of twelve stores, and by 2012 they had opened close to thirty.

Kin's Farm Market organize and participate in community events, including the Green Fighter program, the Dirty Apron Team, and the BC Blueberry Festival. The company has also raised funds for the David Suzuki Foundation and medical research.

In 2013, The Georgia Straight magazine named Kin's Farm Market the best produce store in the British Columbia lower mainland area, and the market was given a Best of Vancouver Readers' Choice Award.
