= Robert Dickson =

Robert, Rob, or Bobby Dickson may refer to:

== Law and politics ==
- Sir Robert Dickson, 1st Baronet (died 1711), MP of the Parliament of Scotland
- Sir Robert Dickson, 2nd Baronet (1694–1760), MP of the Parliament of Scotland
- Robert Dickson (Nova Scotia politician) (1777–1835), farmer and political figure in Nova Scotia
- Robert Dickson (Upper Canada politician) (1796–1846), lawyer and political figure in Upper Canada
- Robert Dickson (1843–1924), Swedish politician, governor in Jönköping and Stockholm, Governor of Stockholm
- Robert Temple Dickson II (1909–1950), American politician; member of the Texas House of Representatives
- Brian Dickson (Robert George Brian Dickson, 1916–1998), chief justice of Canada
- Robert Temple Dickson III (1934–2006), American politician from Texas

== Sports ==
- Bruce Dickson (ice hockey) (Robert Bruce Dickson, 1931–2023), Canadian ice hockey player
- Bob Dickson (born 1944), American golfer
- Bobby Dickson (born 1955), Scottish footballer
- Rob Dickson (1963–2009), Australian rules footballer and film director, winner of Australian Survivor
- Robert Dickson (sailor) (born 1998), Irish sailor

== Others ==
- Robert Dickson (fur trader) (c. 1765–1823), fur trader and official in the Indian Department in Upper Canada
- Robert Dickson (architect) (1926–2014), Australian architect
- Robert Dickson (writer) (1944–2007), Canadian poet and academic
- Robert Dickson (physician) (1804–1875), Scottish physician and botanist

== See also ==
- Robert Dixon (disambiguation)
- Robert Dickinson (disambiguation)
- Dickson (surname)
