= Robert Dixon =

Robert, Rob, Bob, or Bobby Dixon may refer to:

== Arts and entertainment ==
- Robert Dixon (artist) (1780–1815), English landscape artist
- Bobby Digital (Jamaican producer) (Bobby Dixon; 1961–2020), Jamaican reggae and dancehall producer
- Robert Dixon (character), fictional character in Australian TV series Sea Patrol
- Rob Dixon, American jazz saxophonist

== Politicians ==
- Robert Dixon (Irish politician) (1685–1732), Irish MP and judge
- Bob Dixon (Missouri politician) (born 1969), of the Missouri State Senate, formerly served in the Missouri House of Representatives

== Sportspeople ==
- Bob Dixon (athlete) (1907–1941), Canadian athlete
- Bob Dixon (footballer) (1904–1980), English footballer for West Ham United and Stoke
- Bobby Dixon (born 1983), American basketball player
- Rob Dixon (strength athlete) (born 1964), British strongman competitor

== Other people ==
- Robert Dixon (clergyman) (1614–1688), English clergyman
- Robert Dixon (explorer) (1800–1858), Australian explorer
- Robert Dixon (mathematician) (born 1947), British mathematician and graphic artist
- Robert Dixon (soldier) (1921–2024), American World War II veteran, last surviving buffalo soldier
- Robert E. Dixon (1906–1981), U.S. Navy admiral and aviator
- Robert J. Dixon (1920–2003), United States Air Force general
- Robert K. Dixon, energy, environment, and economic expert at the US Department of Energy
- Robert M. W. Dixon (born 1939), Australian linguist
- Robert Vickers Dixon (1812–1885), Irish academic and clergyman
- Robert Campbell Dixon (1857–1933), American architect

== See also ==
- Robert Dixon-Smith, Baron Dixon-Smith (born 1934), British peer and Conservative politician
- Robert Dickson (disambiguation)
