= Robert Dickinson =

Robert Dickinson may refer to:

- Robert Dickinson (athlete) (1901–1981), British Olympic athlete
- Robert Dickinson (British Columbia politician) (1835–1889), Canadian politician
- Robert E. Dickinson (born 1940), American atmospheric scientist
- Robert Edmund Dickinson (1862–1947), British banker and member of parliament for Wells
- Robert Latou Dickinson (1861–1950), American physician, artist and scientist
- Rob Dickinson (born 1965), English rock guitarist and singer
- Robert Dickinson (lighting designer) (born 1954), television lighting designer
- Robert Dickinson (businessman), 19th-century English businessman

== See also ==
- Robert Dickerson (1924–2015), painter
