= David Suzuki Foundation =

Canadian nonprofit environmental organisation

- Type: Nonprofit
- Industry: Environmental policy and education
- Founded: 1991
- Headquarters: Vancouver, British Columbia, Canada
- Key people: Severn Cullis-Suzuki, executive director David Suzuki, co-founder Tara Cullis, co-founder
- Revenue: 5,828,377 Canadian dollar (2003)
- Total assets: 3,174,024 Canadian dollar (2003)
- Number of employees: 49 (2003)
- Website: davidsuzuki.org

The David Suzuki Foundation is a science-based non-profit environmental organization headquartered in Vancouver, British Columbia, with offices in Montreal and Toronto. It was established as a federally registered Canadian charity on January 1, 1991. By 2007, it had 40,000 donors. Its mission is to protect nature while balancing human needs. It is supported entirely by Foundation grants and donations and by 2012, 90% of its donors were Canadian. By 2007, the Foundation employed about seventy-five staff members.

== Overview ==
In 1989, Canadian Broadcasting Corporation aired a radio series by David Suzuki CC OBC FRSC, entitled It's a Matter of Survival which was published in a co-authored 1990 book by the same name. In the series and the book, described how the "first global scientific consensus" that the world was "entering an era of unprecedented climate change" had emerged in the June 1988 international Toronto Conference on the Changing Atmosphere chaired by Stephen Lewis, and with 300 scientists from around the world in attendance. The foundation was formed in response to a 1989 meeting organized by David Suzuki CC OBC FRSC and Tara Cullis with about a dozen invited guests who wanted to work towards reversing global climate change. The Foundation was incorporated on September 14, 1990. Suzuki stepped down from the Board of Directors of the Foundation in April 2012—his wife, Tara Cullis, serves as president of the Board.

According to the Foundation's website its goal is to investigate, communicate and support work that balances "human needs" with the planet's capacity to "sustain all life". While concerned with Canada and Canadians, its focus is on four regions—Ontario and Northern Region, Quebec/Francophone, B.C. and the Western Region. The main areas of concern include the protection of the climate, transformation of the economy, encouraging a reconnection with nature, and community-building.

The Foundation publishes information related to their advocacy work through newsletters, scientific studies, research reports, books, information kits, brochures, and news releases. Some of their major projects included the Trottier Energy Futures Project, Healthy Oceans and Sustainable Seafood which provided a ranking of seafood options published on SeaChoice.org, The Saint Lawrence: Our Living River, the Natural Capital Evaluation, Habitat Protection and Endangered Species, Connecting Youth with Nature, and Living Green (formerly “Queen of Green”).

=== Funding ===
The Foundation was established on January 1, 1991, as a federally registered Canadian charity and is supported entirely by Foundation grants and donations. It does not accept any government funding, except from the National Sciences and Engineering Research Council of Canada. It is also not a funding body for other organizations.

All financial and donor information is publicly available on their official website and through the publication of their annual reports. In their 2006 report they said that about 75% of their 40,000 supporters, donated less than $500. In the FY 2012, they reported that 59% of their funding came from individual donors. Foundations and businesses provided another 25% and 13% respectively and that more than 95% of the donors were Canadian.

According to their 2005-2006 annual report, there were 40,000 donors to the Suzuki Foundation including 52 corporations—Bell Canada, Toyota, IBM, McGraw-Hill Ryerson, Scotia Capital, Warner Bros., Canon and the Bank of Montreal.

After the Foundation implemented its Ethical Gift Acceptance Policy, it no longer accepted donations from fossil fuel industry corporate donors as it had in the past. Prior to the Ethical Gift Acceptance Policy, the Foundation had received funding from the EnCana Corporation, a world leader in natural gas production and oil sands development, and ATCO Gas, Alberta's principal distributor of natural gas, and OPG which is one of the largest suppliers of electricity in the world operating five fossil fuel-burning generation plants and three nuclear plants.

It is also a partnership of the Taylor Mitchell Legacy Trust, which was started after folk singer Taylor Mitchell's death from a coyote attack in 2009 by her mother, Emily, to help people deal with and avoid human-wildlife conflict.

== Activities ==
=== Nutreco Aquaculture ===
The David Suzuki Foundation undertook a "Farmed and Dangerous" campaign about environmental concerns related to the farmed fish industry, with a focus on Nutreco Aquaculture, the largest farmed salmon producer in the world. Vivian Krause, who was hired by Nutreco Aquaculture in 2002 as their North American corporate development manager, actively pursued a public relations campaign to counter criticisms levelled against Nutreco, that had been raised by The David Suzuki Foundation and other environmentalists. Krause accessed publicly available online information related to tax revenue to create spreadsheets on names of donors who funded environmental organizations in Canada, and to publish her findings on her Fair Questions blog. This included the information that the David Suzuki Foundation, had received $44 million from tax receipted donations between 2000 and 2010.

In February 2004, Suzuki met with the Prime Minister of Canada, Paul Martin, to present the Foundation's report on how sustainability could be achieved within a generation."Canada vs the OECD: An Environmental Comparison", a 2001 report published by University of Victoria Eco-Research Chair of Environmental Law and Policy Staff and authored by David R. Boyd, environmental lawyer and coauthor of the forthcoming book David Suzuki's Guide to Helping the Planet, examined 25 environmental indicators, ranks Canada 28th out of the 29 OECD nations. The foundation and Boyd created a separate report, "Sustainability within a Generation", that addresses Canada's capacities to improve sustainability and environmental conservation. The foundation believes this can be best accomplished by improving efficiency, eliminating waste and pollution, and building sustainable cities.

The 2000s Nature Challenge, which was established in consultation with the Union of Concerned Scientists encouraged Canadians to reduce home energy use, using energy-efficient appliances and vehicles, drive personal vehicles less by using public transit, biking or walking and by living closer to work or school, buying locally grown food, eat more vegetarian meals, avoid use of pesticides. As of November 2007, over 500 000 individuals had taken David Suzuki's Nature Challenge. Many famous Canadians have taken David Suzuki's Nature Challenge, including Nelly Furtado, Sam Roberts, Margaret Atwood, Robert Munsch, Larry Campbell, and David Miller.

=== La Rose et al. v. Her Majesty the Queen ===
On October 25, 2019, The David Suzuki Foundation along with the Our Children's Trust and 15 youth activists including Cecilia La Rose, Sierra Robinson and Sáj Gray-Starcevich, launched a federal lawsuit against the Canadian government claiming that the government has violated the youth's Charter of Rights and Freedoms. The lawsuit asks the Canadian Government to immediately begin reducing Canada's green house gas emissions to mitigate the effects of climate change.

== Criticism ==
=== Genetically modified food ===
By the early 2010s, there was a scientific consensus that at that time, genetically modified food was as safe as conventional food. WHO clarified that each new GM food introduced needed to be tested on a case-by-case basis.

In 2012, the Foundation's 2012 website still allegedly had a page entitled an "Understanding GMO" page which said that at that time, "the safety of GMO foods" was "unproven" and that "a growing body of research" had connected "these foods with health concerns". This page is no longer hosted on their website.

== Tax emptions status and political activities ==
Since at least 2007, concerns have been raised about how much—if any political activity—can charities with tax exemptions undertake. Columnist Licia Corbella, formerly of The Calgary Sun is a long-standing critic of the David Suzuki Foundation and is known for denying the existence of human-caused climate change. Writing about Suzuki meeting with Calgary elementary school students, states that the speech "was essentially urging those listening not to vote Conservative. That makes his message partisan and should exempt the David Suzuki Foundation from receiving tax deductible status." In 2007, Suzuki distinguished between what he says as an individual and what the foundation formally states. His personal opinions have been published, including the statement that Ottawa's plan to fight global warming was a "national embarrassment" and the federal government's energy policy was "not a strategy" but a "shame." According to a 2007 article in Treehugger, in Canadian law, charities are permitted to comment on politics, "Charities have wide latitude to comment on politics, provided they don't endorse parties or candidates and can devote up to 10 per cent of their resources for non-partisan political activities". Charitable organizations can spend funds "to influence law, policy, and public opinion on matters related to its charitable purposes." This includes meeting with elected officials, holding "conferences, workshops, lectures and rallies", and mounting "letter-writing campaigns about issues".

In 2012, when then Prime Minister Stephen Harper was engaged in "scorching attacks on environmental activists and charities." the federal 2012 budget earmarked $8 million to the Canada Revenue Agency (CRA) to audit selected charities—including seven environmental groups were soon targeted. The CRA budget for these political-activity audits was subsequently increased to $13 million a year which allowed the CRA to audit anti-poverty, foreign aid and human rights groups charities, such as Amnesty International, the Canadian Centre for Policy Alternatives, and the United Church of Canada. An investigation by the Canadian Press reported in Maclean's in 2014, said that the majority of the ten 2012-2013 political-activity audits were "conducted on charities in one narrow category—environmental groups, all of whom opposed" the Harper administration's energy policies." which included the David Suzuki Foundation. In 2015, an investigation undertaken by the journalist, Mike De Souza, published in the Narwhal, showed that a senator who was keenly interested in Krause's research on environmental groups, had "worked to advance Krause's public persona, introducing her to key figures in the Canadian political and energy landscape".

== See also ==
- Environmental Dispute Resolution Fund
- List of foundations in Canada
- West Coast Environmental Law
