= It's a Matter of Survival =

1990 book by Anita Gordon and David Suzuki

- First edition
- Author: Anita Gordon, David Suzuki
- Publisher: Stoddart Publishing
- Publication date: 1990
- ISBN: 0-674-46970-4
- OCLC: 22420142
- Dewey Decimal: 363.7 20
- LC Class: GF75 .G66 1991

It's a Matter of Survival is a 1990 book by Anita Gordon and David Suzuki. Written for the general reader, the book looks ahead 50 years and explores the condition of human society and the environment. Suggestions are given about how to improve the future. The book originated as a radio series aired in 1989 by the Canadian Broadcasting Corporation.

== Overview ==
The book and series described how the "first global scientific consensus" that the world was "entering an era of unprecedented climate change" had emerged in the June 1988 international Toronto Conference on the Changing Atmosphere, which was chaired by Stephen Lewis and had 300 scientists from around the world in attendance.

On the webpage of the David Suzuki Foundation (a non-profit environmental organization headquartered in Vancouver, British Columbia, Canada, that Suzuki co-founded in 1991) Suzuki said that the response to the CBC radio show was the catalyst for the establishment of the Foundation.

== See also ==
- List of books by David Suzuki
