= Sarah Dixon =

English poet

Sarah Dixon (baptised 28 September 1671 – 23 April 1765) was an English poet, probably born in Rochester, Kent, where she was baptised. She took to writing "during a Youth of much Leisure", although her earliest surviving dated poem is from 1716. The 500 subscribers to her anonymous Poems on Several Occasions included Elizabeth Carter and Alexander Pope, and the society hostess Maria Coventry, Countess of Coventry.

== Family and work ==
Dixon was the daughter of James Dixon, barrister at the Middle Temple, and Elizabeth Southouse, and the granddaughter of Prebendary Robert Dixon (died 1688). She is likely to have spent most of her life at St Stephen's, also known as Hackington, just north of Canterbury, although it has been suggested the family moved to Newnham, Kent when her father remarried.

Dixon had a brother, who probably died in his late teens. There are indications that she also had a sister. Her niece, Mrs Eliza Bunce (née De Langle), was among her subscribers and added further poems of Dixon's to her copy. Eliza Bunce's husband, Rev. John Bunce (died 1786), Vicar of St Stephen's, encouraged Dixon and corrected her work for publication. Her poem "The Ruins of St. Austin's, Canterbury" (the oldest Christian site in Britain) was written at the age of 73 and appeared posthumously in 1774 in the Kentish Gazette.

Although Dixon is described in one copy of her printed work as a widow, the memorial stone on the chancel floor of St Stephen's calls her only the daughter of James Dixon, barrister. A 1739 poem of hers addresses John and Eliza Bunce on the death of a daughter. One of the verses in her volume is entitled "On the Death of my Dear Brother, Late of University College, Oxford". No husband or children are mentioned.

== Opinions ==
Dixon described her own work as "all artless, uninformed", but she was versatile and appears to have been well read.

A modern critic calls her "a mordant satirist of both sexes: her love poems... run the gamut from rejoicing to pathos to scoffing." Another notes how "individual poems range from light, but pointed satire on the follies and failings of women, through romantic, ballad-like lyrics, to earnest, mature, religious verse." A third comments, "Sarah Dixon, who shows so much insight into matters of the heart, embodies the merits of family loyalty and patriotism."

== Death ==
Sarah Dixon died on 23 April 1765 at the age of 93, according to the St Austin's memorial stone, at the village of Hackington, Kent.
