= Senate Hearing of James E. Hansen (1988) =

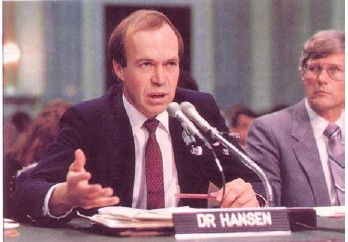
James E. Hansen testifies before the U.S. Senate Committee on Energy and Natural Resources on June 23, 1988.

On June 23, 1988, American climatologist James E. Hansen testified before the United States Senate Committee on Energy and Natural Resources regarding global warming, during a period of high temperatures in the United States. The hearing marked one of the earliest instances in which anthropogenic climate change was prominently addressed in U.S. political and media discourse, having previously been discussed primarily in academic contexts.

== Context ==
The hypothesis that climate warming could result from human emissions of greenhouse gases was discussed in the academic community beginning in the 1970s. During that period, computer climate models began projecting a rise in global temperatures, in contrast to earlier hypotheses that had suggested the possibility of global cooling and a future glaciation. Based on climate modeling and physical principles, the Charney Report, presented to the White House in 1979, concluded that a warming of the climate was probable, though it did not specify a timeframe. Throughout the 1980s, the topic received limited attention in news media and policy discussions.

James E. Hansen, a climatologist and director of NASA's Goddard Institute for Space Studies (GISS), testified in June 1986 before the United States Senate Subcommittee on Environmental Pollution during hearings that also addressed the depletion of the ozone layer. He later testified in November 1987 before the Senate Committee on Energy and Natural Resources. While some of the findings presented by Hansen and other researchers on the potential risks of climate change were reported in national media in 1986, the 1987 testimony received relatively limited coverage.

In 1988, the United States experienced a widespread drought and elevated temperatures. These conditions contributed to wildfires in Yellowstone National Park, agricultural losses, and increased livestock mortality. The events were widely reported and prompted public discussion.

== Testimony of James E. Hansen ==
On June 23, 1988, Democratic senator Tim Wirth of Colorado, a member of the Senate Committee on Energy and Natural Resources, organized a hearing on “the greenhouse effect and climate change.”

In a 2007 interview, Wirth stated that the hearing had been scheduled to coincide with a period of historically high temperatures in Washington, D.C., and claimed that the hearing room temperature was deliberately raised to make participants appear visibly warm on television. Subsequent reporting by The Washington Post and later clarifications by Wirth indicated that this account was inaccurate. The hearing nonetheless took place on what was then the hottest June 23 on record in Washington, a record that remained in place until at least 2021.

James Hansen, climatologist and director of NASA's Goddard Institute for Space Studies (GISS), was the first witness to testify. He began his statement with the following summary:

I would like to draw three main conclusions. Number one, the earth is warmer in 1988 than at any time in the history of instrumental measurements. Number two, the global warming is now large enough that we can ascribe with a high degree of confidence a cause and effect relationship to the greenhouse effect. And number three, our computer climate simulations indicate that the greenhouse effect is already large enough to begin to affect the probability of extreme events such as summer heat waves.

Regarding the second point, Hansen stated that there was a 99% probability that the temperatures observed in 1988—approximately 0.5°C above the 1950–1980 average—were attributable to anthropogenic climate change rather than natural variability. He noted, however, that he did not attribute the contemporaneous drought in the United States to climate change. His conclusions were based on the consistency between observed trends—including stratospheric cooling, rising tropospheric temperatures, and greater warming at high latitudes—and the expected outcomes of an enhanced greenhouse effect. At the time, Hansen's assertion that anthropogenic climate change had already begun was regarded as a significant departure from previous scientific statements on the issue.

He also presented projections from climate models developed at GISS, which simulated global temperature changes through 2019 under three emissions scenarios: high growth, moderate growth, and decline.

== Reception and legacy ==
=== Media reception ===
James Hansen's testimony before the United States Senate Committee on Energy and Natural Resources on June 23, 1988, received widespread media coverage. The following day, The New York Times featured the hearing on its front page under the headline: Global Warming Has Begun, Expert Tells Senate. In the article, Hansen was quoted as saying: “It is time to stop waffling so much and say that the evidence is pretty strong that the greenhouse effect is here.” He was also interviewed by several television networks, and the hearing marked his emergence as a prominent public figure in discussions related to climate change.

Historians and journalists have described Hansen's 1988 testimony as a key moment in the history of climate change communication, bringing the issue into broader public and political discourse. While media outlets had previously reported on the greenhouse effect and related scientific findings, Hansen's statement was one of the first instances in which a scientist publicly asserted, with a high level of confidence, that anthropogenic climate change was already underway. His comments, which included references to a potential increase in extreme heat events, drew added attention amid the 1988 heat wave in the United States. Public opinion surveys from that period showed an increase in awareness of climate change among Americans.

Communication scholar Richard Besel has noted that Hansen's 1988 testimony differed from his earlier Senate appearances in 1986 and 1987. In 1988, Hansen emphasized results rather than methodology and presented his message in more simplified and direct terms, minimizing technical detail and expressions of uncertainty. This contrasted with his previous testimonies, which had focused more on scientific methods and the remaining gaps in knowledge.

=== Reception in the academic sphere ===
Hansen's position at the time reflected a more assertive interpretation of available data than that expressed by some of his contemporaries. Syukuro Manabe, another climate modeler who testified at the same hearing, adopted a more cautious stance and did not assert that anthropogenic climate change had already begun. Several climate scientists considered Hansen's conclusions premature, citing the possibility that the observed warming could still be explained by natural variability.

Subsequent research has supported the conclusion that anthropogenic climate change was already detectable during the 1980s. Climate developments in the decades following Hansen's testimony have proceeded at a rate close to, though somewhat below, the projections outlined in Scenario B of the Goddard Institute for Space Studies (GISS) model. The model relied on an estimate of climate sensitivity that was likely higher than current estimates and did not account for the reduction in chlorofluorocarbon (CFC) emissions following the implementation of the Montreal Protocol.

=== Political consideration ===
The Senate hearing and the media attention surrounding Hansen's testimony occurred shortly before the Toronto Conference on the Changing Atmosphere, held in June 1988. The conference characterized climate change as a significant global risk and called for a 20% reduction in greenhouse gas emissions by 2005. Around the same time, climate change entered political discussions during the 1988 United States presidential election, featuring in the platforms of both major parties. Hansen's testimony coincided with increasing political engagement with climate issues and preceded the establishment of international climate governance frameworks. The Intergovernmental Panel on Climate Change (IPCC) was created later in 1988 as a joint initiative of the World Meteorological Organization (WMO) and the United Nations Environment Programme (UNEP), marking a significant institutional response to growing scientific and public concern about climate change.

== See also ==
- History of climate change science
- Charney Report
- Toronto Conference on the Changing Atmosphere

== Bibliography ==
- Foucart, Stéphane (July 14, 2015). "James Hansen, Cassandre du climat" [James Hansen, climate Cassandra]. Le Monde (in French).
- Sinclair, Peter (June 20, 2018). "Judgment on Hansen's '88 climate testimony: 'He was right'". yaleclimateconnections.org.
- Weart, Spencer (2008). The Discovery of Global Warming. Harvard University Press. doi:10.4159/9780674417557. ISBN 978-0-674-03189-0.
