= History of climate change science =

John Tyndall's ratio spectrophotometer (drawing from 1861) measured how much infrared radiation was absorbed and emitted by various gases filling its central tube. Such measurements furthered understanding of the greenhouse effect that underlies global warming and climate change.

The history of the scientific discovery of climate change began in the early 19th century when ice ages and other natural changes in paleoclimate were first suspected and the natural greenhouse effect was first identified. In the late 19th century, scientists first argued that human emissions of greenhouse gases could change Earth's energy balance and climate. The existence of the greenhouse effect, while not named as such, was proposed as early as 1824 by Joseph Fourier. The argument and the evidence were further strengthened by Claude Pouillet in 1827 and 1838. In 1856 Eunice Newton Foote demonstrated that the warming effect of the sun is greater for air with water vapour than for dry air, and the effect is even greater with carbon dioxide.

John Tyndall was the first to measure the infrared absorption and emission of various gases and vapors. From 1859 onwards, he showed that the effect was due to a very small proportion of the atmosphere, with the main gases having no effect, and was largely due to water vapor, though small percentages of hydrocarbons and carbon dioxide had a significant effect. The effect was more fully quantified by Svante Arrhenius in 1896, who made the first quantitative prediction of global warming due to a hypothetical doubling of atmospheric carbon dioxide.

In the 1960s, the evidence for the warming effect of carbon dioxide gas became increasingly convincing. Scientists also discovered that human activities that generated atmospheric aerosols (e.g., air pollution) could have cooling effects as well (later referred to as global dimming). Other theories for the causes of global warming were also proposed, involving forces from volcanism to solar variation. During the 1970s, scientific understanding of global warming greatly increased.

By the 1990s, as the result of improving the accuracy of computer models and observational work confirming the Milankovitch theory of the ice ages, a consensus position formed. It became clear that greenhouse gases were deeply involved in most climate changes and human-caused emissions were bringing discernible global warming.

Since the 1990s, scientific research on climate change has included multiple disciplines and has expanded. Research has expanded the understanding of causal relations, links with historic data, and abilities to measure and model climate change. Research during this period has been summarized in the Assessment Reports by the Intergovernmental Panel on Climate Change starting in 1990. Extreme event attribution (EEA), also known as attribution science and developed in the early decades of the 21st century, uses climate models to identify and quantify the role that human-caused climate change plays in the frequency, intensity, duration, and impacts of specific individual extreme weather events.

== Prior to the 20th century ==
=== Regional changes, antiquity through 19th century ===
From ancient times, people suspected that the climate of a region could change over the course of centuries. For example, Theophrastus, a pupil of Ancient Greek philosopher Aristotle in the 4th century BC, told how the draining of marshes had made a particular locality more susceptible to freezing, and speculated that lands became warmer when the clearing of forests exposed them to sunlight. In the 1st century BC, Roman writer and architect Vitruvius wrote about climate in relation to housing architecture and how to choose locations for cities. Renaissance European and later scholars saw that deforestation, irrigation, and grazing had altered the lands around the Mediterranean since ancient times; they thought it plausible that these human interventions had affected the local weather. In his book published in 1088, Northern Song dynasty Chinese scholar and statesman Shen Kuo promoted the theory of gradual climate change over centuries of time once ancient petrified bamboos were found to be preserved underground in the dry climate zone and arid northern region of Yanzhou, now modern day Yan'an, Shaanxi, far from the warmer, wetter climate areas of China where bamboos typically grow.

The 18th and 19th-century conversion of Eastern North America from forest to croplands brought obvious change within a human lifetime. From the early 19th century, many believed the transformation was altering the region's climate—probably for the better. When farmers in America, dubbed "sodbusters", took over the Great Plains, they held that "rain follows the plow". Other experts disagreed, and some argued that deforestation caused rapid rainwater run-off and flooding, and could even result in reduced rainfall. European academics, suggesting that the temperate zones inhabited by the "Caucasian race" were naturally superior for the spread of civilization, proffered that the Orientals of the Ancient Near East had heedlessly converted their once lush lands into impoverished deserts.

Meanwhile, national weather agencies had begun to compile masses of reliable observations of temperature, rainfall, and the like. When these figures were analyzed, they showed many rises and dips, but no steady long-term change. By the end of the 19th century, scientific opinion had turned decisively against any belief in a human influence on climate. And whatever the regional effects, few imagined that humans could affect the climate of the planet as a whole.

=== Paleo-climate change and theories of its causes, 19th century ===
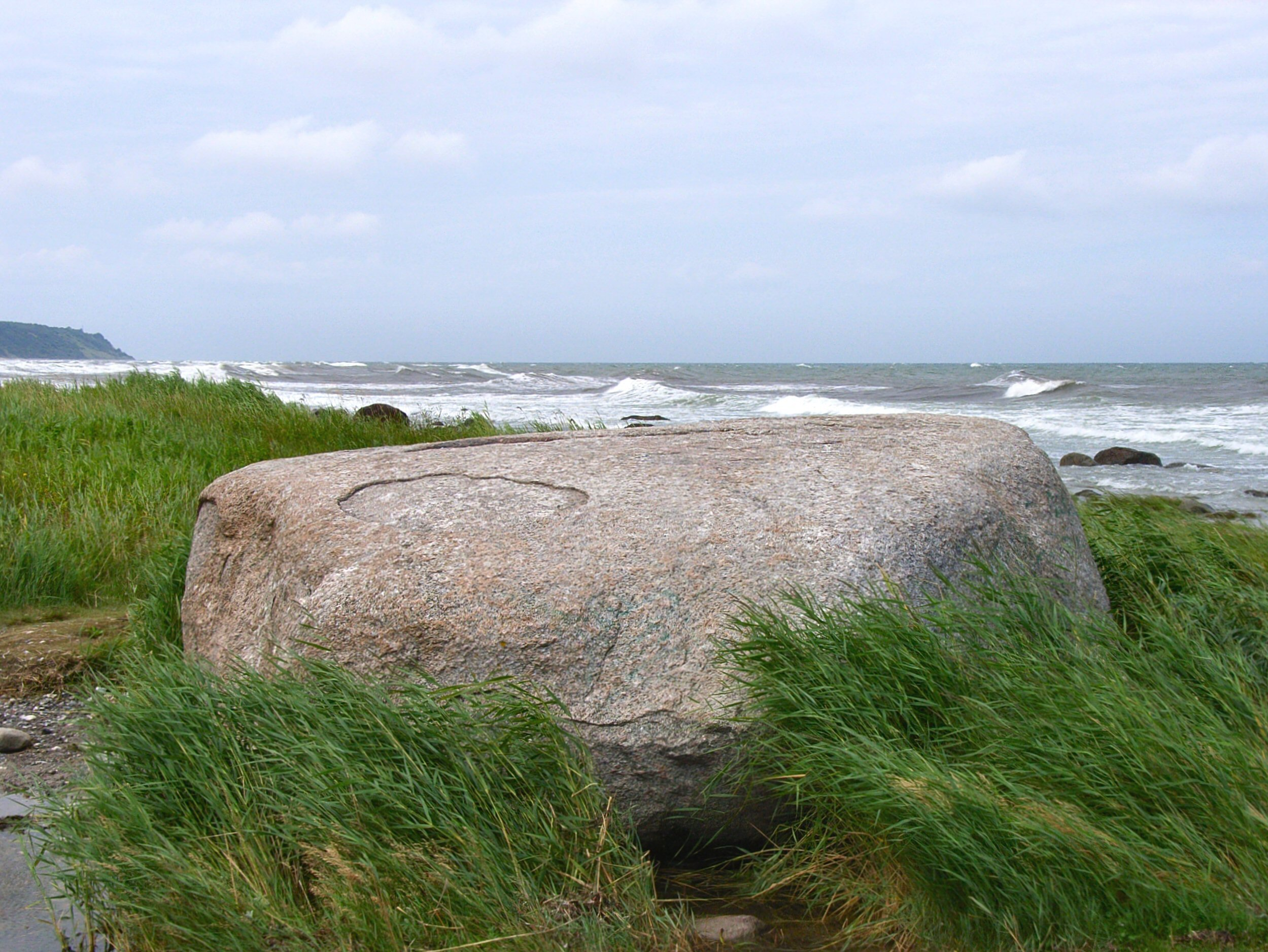
Erratics, boulders deposited by glaciers far from any existing glaciers, led geologists to the conclusion that climate had changed in the past.

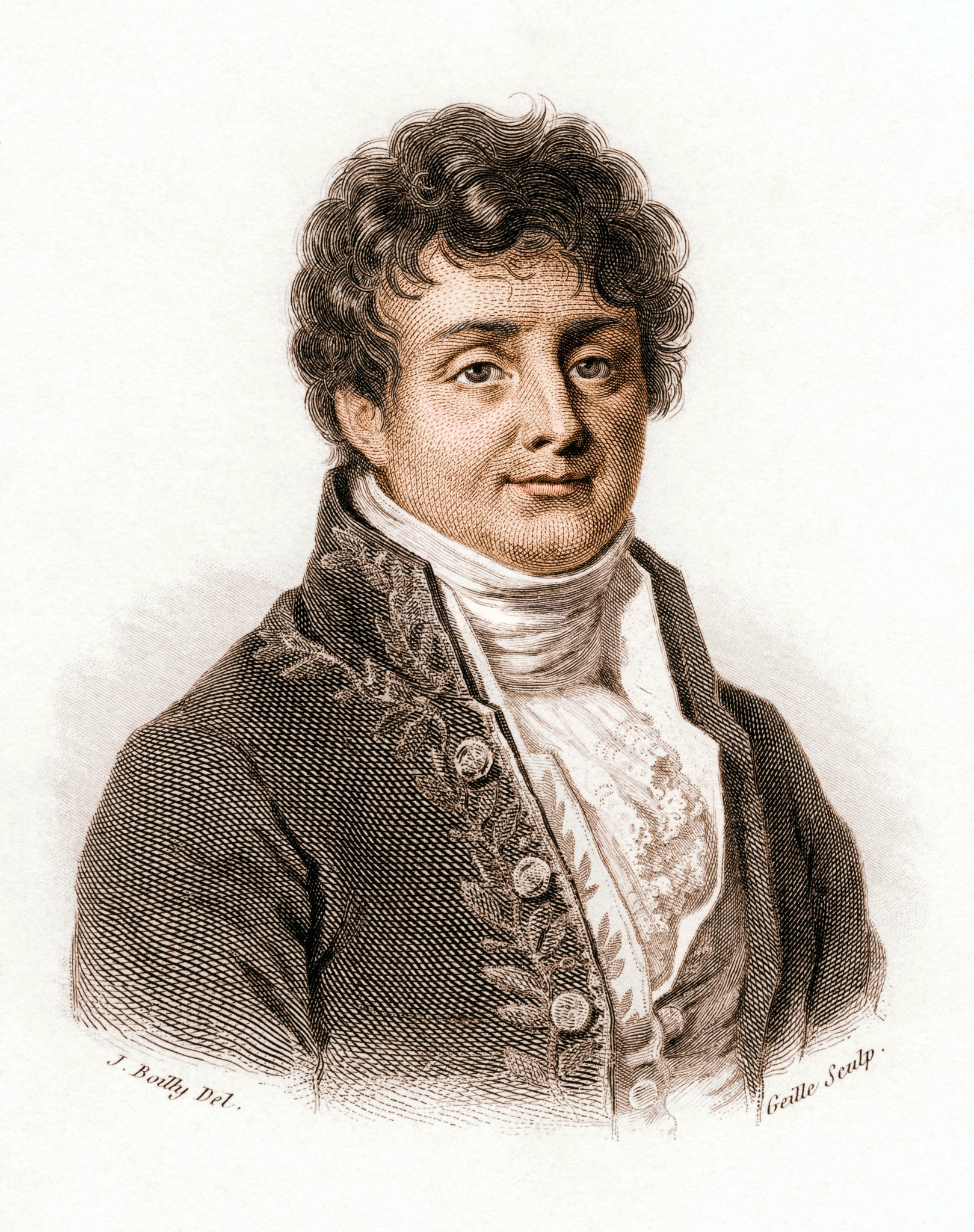
Joseph Fourier

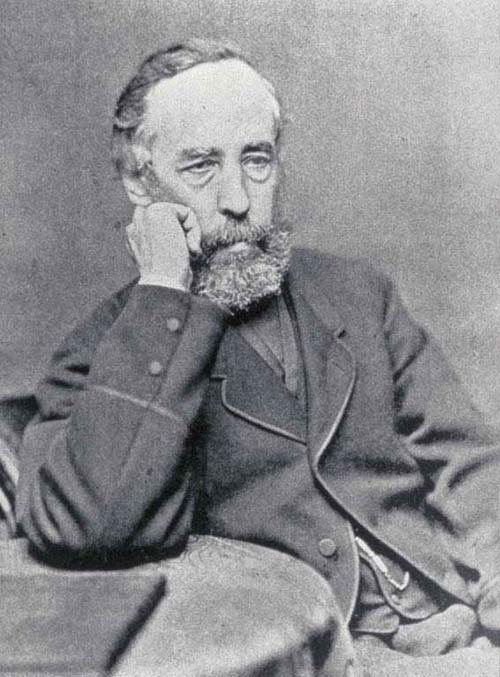
James Croll

From the mid-17th century, naturalists attempted to reconcile mechanical philosophy with theology, initially within a biblical timescale. By the late 18th century, there was increasing acceptance of prehistoric epochs. Geologists found evidence of a succession of geological ages with climate changes. There were various competing theories about these changes; Buffon proposed that the Earth had begun as an incandescent globe and was very gradually cooling. James Hutton, whose ideas of cyclic change over huge periods were later dubbed uniformitarianism, was among those who found signs of past glacial activity in places too warm for glaciers in modern times.

In 1815 Jean-Pierre Perraudin described for the first time how glaciers might be responsible for the giant boulders seen in alpine valleys. As he hiked in the Val de Bagnes, he noticed giant granite rocks that were scattered around the narrow valley. He knew that it would take an exceptional force to move such large rocks. He also noticed how glaciers left stripes on the land and concluded that it was the ice that had carried the boulders down into the valleys.

His idea was initially met with disbelief. Jean de Charpentier wrote, "I found his hypothesis so extraordinary and even so extravagant that I considered it as not worth examining or even considering." Despite Charpentier's initial rejection, Perraudin eventually convinced Ignaz Venetz that it might be worth studying. Venetz convinced Charpentier, who in turn convinced the influential scientist Louis Agassiz that the glacial theory had merit.

Agassiz developed a theory of what he termed "Ice age"—when glaciers covered Europe and much of North America. In 1837 Agassiz was the first to scientifically propose that the Earth had been subject to a past ice age. William Buckland had been a leading proponent in Britain of flood geology, later dubbed catastrophism, which accounted for erratic boulders and other "diluvium" as relics of the Biblical flood. This was strongly opposed by Charles Lyell's version of Hutton's uniformitarianism and was gradually abandoned by Buckland and other catastrophist geologists. A field trip to the Alps with Agassiz in October 1838 convinced Buckland that features in Britain had been caused by glaciation, and both he and Lyell strongly supported the ice age theory which became widely accepted by the 1870s.

Before the concept of ice ages was proposed, Joseph Fourier in 1824 reasoned based on physics that Earth's atmosphere kept the planet warmer than would be the case in a vacuum. Fourier recognized that the atmosphere transmitted visible light waves efficiently to the earth's surface. The earth then absorbed visible light and emitted infrared radiation in response, but the atmosphere did not transmit infrared efficiently, which therefore increased surface temperatures. He also suspected that human activities could influence the radiation balance and Earth's climate, although he focused primarily on land-use changes. In an 1827 paper, Fourier stated,

The establishment and progress of human societies, the action of natural forces, can notably change, and in vast regions, the state of the surface, the distribution of water and the great movements of the air. Such effects are able to make to vary, in the course of many centuries, the average degree of heat; because the analytic expressions contain coefficients relating to the state of the surface and which greatly influence the temperature.

Fourier's work built on previous discoveries: in 1681 Edme Mariotte noted that glass, though transparent to sunlight, obstructs radiant heat. Around 1774 Horace Bénédict de Saussure showed that non-luminous warm objects emit infrared heat, and used a glass-topped insulated box to trap and measure heat from sunlight.

The physicist Claude Pouillet proposed in 1838 that water vapor and carbon dioxide might trap infrared and warm the atmosphere, but there was still no experimental evidence of these gases absorbing heat from thermal radiation.

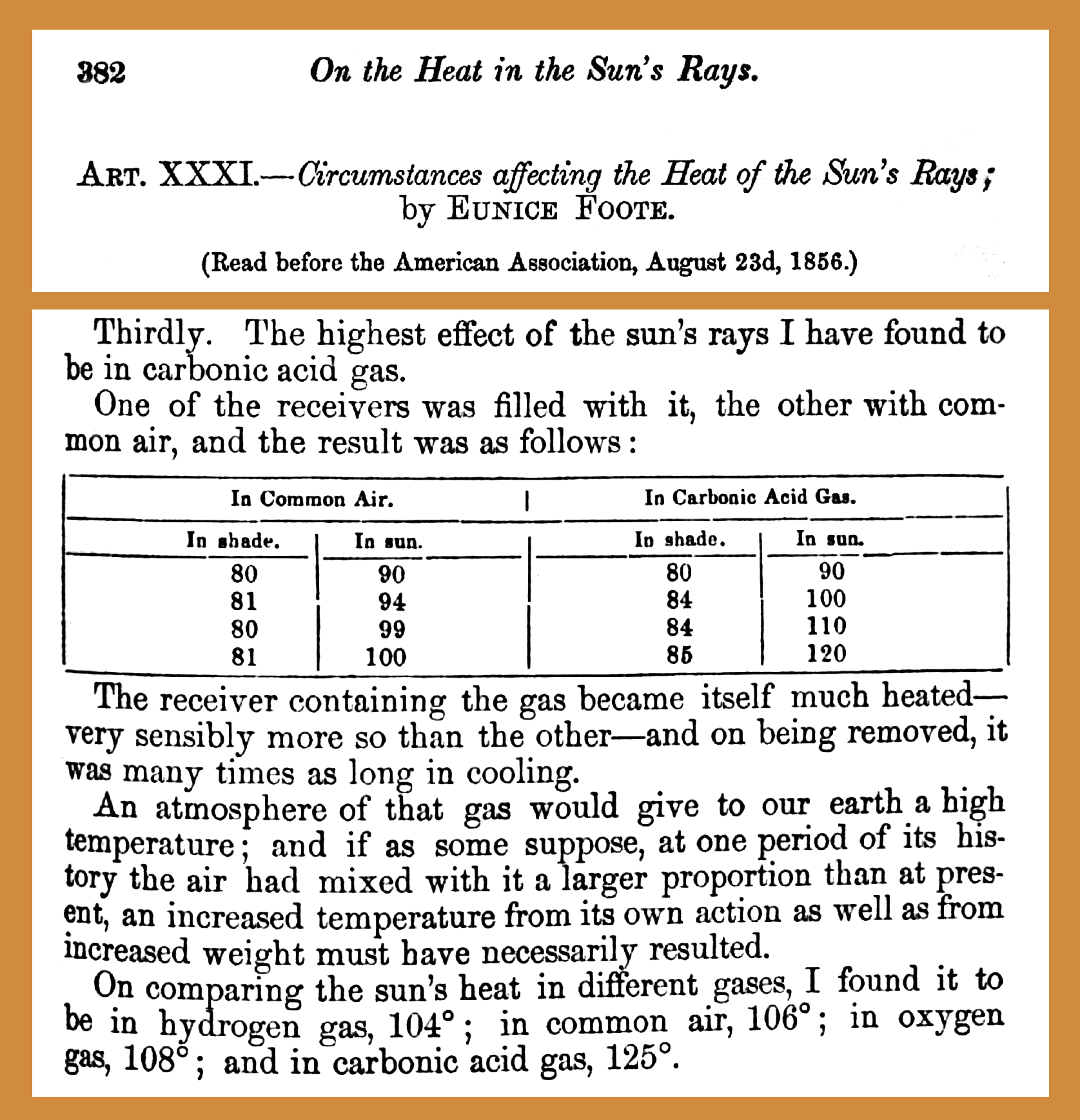
Eunice Newton Foote recognized carbon dioxide's heat-capturing effect in 1856, appreciating its implications for the planet.

The warming effect of sunlight on different gases was examined in 1856 by Eunice Newton Foote, who described her experiments using glass tubes exposed to sunlight. The warming effect of the sun was greater for compressed air than for an evacuated tube and greater for moist air than dry air. "Thirdly, the highest effect of the sun's rays I have found to be in carbonic acid gas." (carbon dioxide) She continued: "An atmosphere of that gas would give to our earth a high temperature; and if, as some suppose, at one period of its history, the air had mixed with it a larger proportion than at present, an increased temperature from its action, as well as from an increased weight, must have necessarily resulted." Her work was presented by Prof. Joseph Henry at the American Association for the Advancement of Science meeting in August 1856 and described as a brief note written by then journalist David Ames Wells; her paper was published later that year in the American Journal of Science and Arts. Few noticed the paper and it was only rediscovered in the 21st century,

John Tyndall took Fourier's work one step further in 1859 when he built an apparatus to investigate the absorption of infrared radiation in different gases. He found that water vapor, hydrocarbons like methane (CH_{4}), and carbon dioxide (CO_{2}) strongly block the radiation. He understood that without these gases the planet would rapidly freeze.

Some scientists suggested that ice ages and other great climate changes were due to changes in the amount of gases emitted in volcanism. But that was only one of many possible causes. Another obvious possibility was solar variation. Shifts in ocean currents also might explain many climate changes. For changes over millions of years, the raising and lowering of mountain ranges would change patterns of both winds and ocean currents. Or perhaps the climate of a continent had not changed at all, but it had grown warmer or cooler because of polar wander (the North Pole shifting to where the Equator had been or the like). There were dozens of theories.

For example, in the mid-19th century, James Croll published calculations of how the gravitational pulls of the Sun, Moon, and planets subtly affect the Earth's motion and orientation. The inclination of the Earth's axis and the shape of its orbit around the Sun oscillate gently in cycles lasting tens of thousands of years. During some periods the Northern Hemisphere would get slightly less sunlight during the winter than it would get during other centuries. Snow would accumulate, reflecting sunlight and leading to a self-sustaining ice age. Most scientists, however, found Croll's ideas—and every other theory of climate change—unconvincing.

=== First calculations of greenhouse effect, 1896 ===
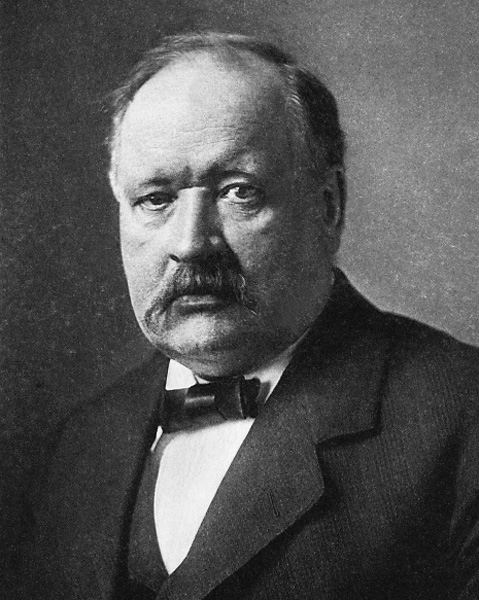
In 1896 Svante Arrhenius calculated the effect of a doubling atmospheric carbon dioxide to be an increase in surface temperatures of 5–6 degrees Celsius.

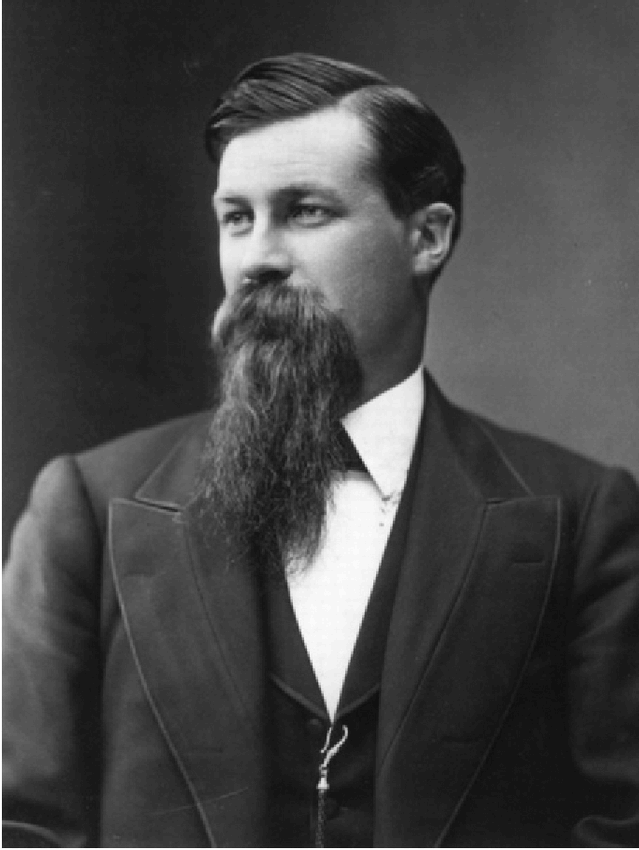
T. C. Chamberlin

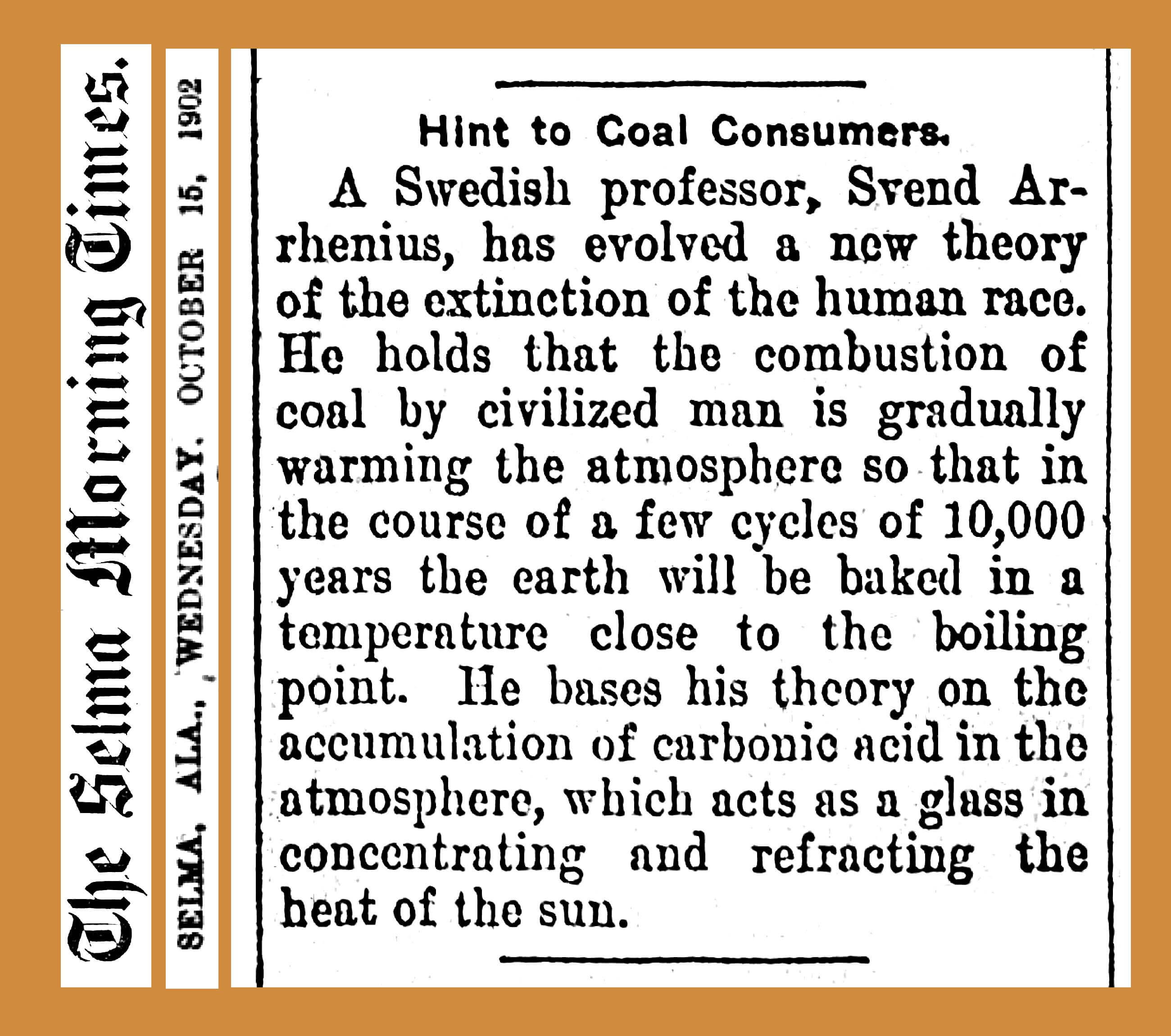
This 1902 article attributes to Svante Arrhenius a theory that coal combustion could eventually lead to human extinction.

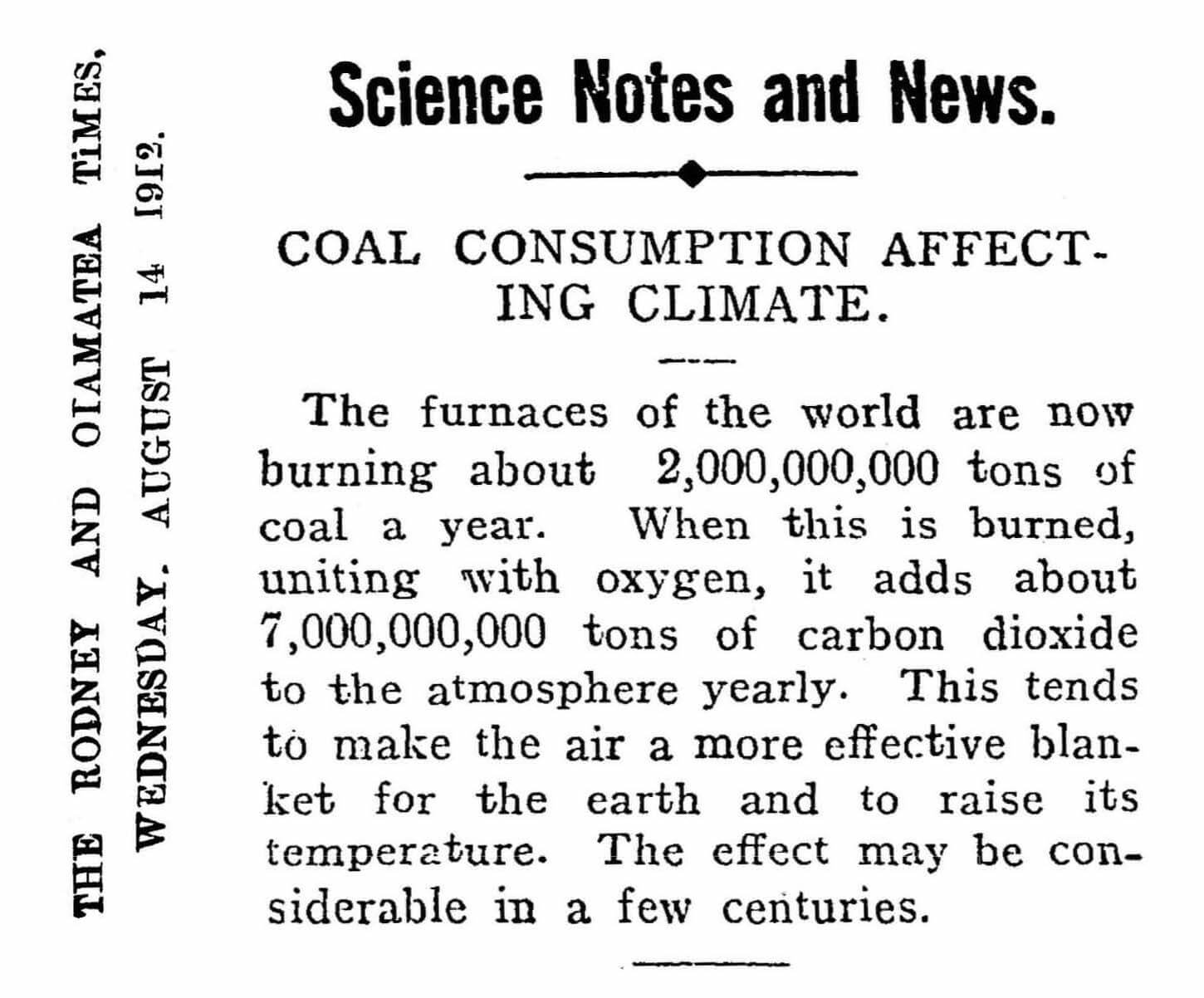
This 1912 article, earlier published in Popular Mechanics, succinctly describes the greenhouse effect, describing how burning coal creates carbon dioxide that causes climate change.

By the late 1890s, Samuel Pierpoint Langley along with Frank W. Very had attempted to determine the surface temperature of the Moon by measuring infrared radiation leaving the Moon and reaching the Earth. The angle of the Moon in the sky when a scientist took a measurement determined how much CO_{2} and water vapor the Moon's radiation had to pass through to reach the Earth's surface, resulting in weaker measurements when the Moon was low in the sky. This result was unsurprising given that scientists had known about infrared radiation absorption for decades.

In 1896 Svante Arrhenius used Langley's observations of increased infrared absorption where Moon rays pass through the atmosphere at a low angle, encountering more carbon dioxide (CO_{2}), to estimate an atmospheric cooling effect from a future decrease of CO_{2}. He realized that the cooler atmosphere would hold less water vapor (another greenhouse gas) and calculated the additional cooling effect. He also realized the cooling would increase snow and ice cover at high latitudes, making the planet reflect more sunlight and thus further cool down, as James Croll had hypothesized. Overall Arrhenius calculated that cutting CO_{2} in half would suffice to produce an ice age. He further calculated that a doubling of atmospheric CO_{2} would give a total warming of 5–6 degrees Celsius.

Further, Arrhenius' colleague Arvid Högbom, who was quoted in length in Arrhenius' 1896 study On the Influence of Carbonic Acid in the Air upon the Temperature of the Earth had been attempting to quantify natural sources of emissions of CO_{2} for purposes of understanding the global carbon cycle. Högbom found that estimated carbon production from industrial sources in the 1890s (mainly coal burning) was comparable with the natural sources. Arrhenius saw that this human emission of carbon would eventually lead to a warming energy imbalance. However, because of the relatively low rate of CO_{2} production in 1896, Arrhenius thought the warming would take thousands of years, and he expected it would be beneficial to humanity. In 1908 he revised this prediction to take hundreds of years due to the ever increasing rate of fuel use and that within his lifetime this would benefit humanity.

In 1899 Thomas Chrowder Chamberlin developed at length the idea that climate changes could result from changes in the concentration of atmospheric carbon dioxide. Chamberlin wrote in his 1899 book, An Attempt to Frame a Working Hypothesis of the Cause of Glacial Periods on an Atmospheric Basis:

By the investigations of Tyndall, Lecher and Pretner, Keller, Roentgen, and Arrhenius, it has been shown that the carbon dioxide and water vapor of the atmosphere have remarkable power of absorbing and temporarily retaining heat rays, while the oxygen, nitrogen, and argon of the atmosphere possess this power in a feeble degree only. It follows that the effect of the carbon dioxide and water vapor is to blanket the earth with a thermally absorbent envelope. .. The general results assignable to a greatly increased or a greatly reduced quantity of atmospheric carbon dioxide and water may be summarized as follows:

- a. An increase, by causing a larger absorption of the sun's radiant energy, raises the average temperature, while a reduction lowers it. The estimate of Dr. Arrhenius, based upon an elaborate mathematical discussion of the observations of Professor Langley, is that an increase of the carbon dioxide to the amount of two or three times the present content would elevate the average temperature 8° or 9 °C. and would bring on a mild climate analogous to that which prevailed in the Middle Tertiary age. On the other hand, a reduction of the quantity of carbon dioxide in the atmosphere to an amount ranging from 55 to 62 per cent, of the present content, would reduce the average temperature 4 or 5 C, which would bring on a glaciation comparable to that of the Pleistocene period.
- b. A second effect of increase and decrease in the amount of atmospheric carbon dioxide is the equalization, on the one hand, of surface temperatures, or their differentiation on the other. [...]

The term "greenhouse effect" for this warming was introduced by Nils Gustaf Ekholm in 1901. Crucially, Ekholm recognised the fact that water vapour is an amplifier of climate change not a driver because water is condensable. (Note: "Aqueous vapour alone is, however, unable to produce any radical change of climate. For the quantity of aqueous vapour in the atmosphere is itself depending upon the temperature of the air; if this be lowered by some cause, for instance by radiation, the aqueous vapour is partly condensed and separated from the atmosphere, whereby its protecting influence is diminished, and then the increased radiation causes a new condensation of vapour, and so on. It is, therefore, only in regions and seasons already favoured by nature with a warm and damp climate that aqueous vapour alone is able to play the part of green-house glass; whereas in cold and dry regions, where the protection is most needed, aqueous vapour fails. The case will be quite different when the carbonic acid comes into play. This gas is not condensed at any temperature occurring in the lower strata of the air. Its protecting power is thus equally active in all climates. If now the quantity of carbonic acid increases, the temperature, as already stated, will rise. But thereby also evaporation, and, of course, the quantity of aqueous vapour in the air, mill be increased, by which the radiation from earth into space will be still diminished.") Therefore, the amount of carbon dioxide in the atmosphere plays a key role in mediating the amount of water vapor in the atmosphere.

== 20th century onwards ==
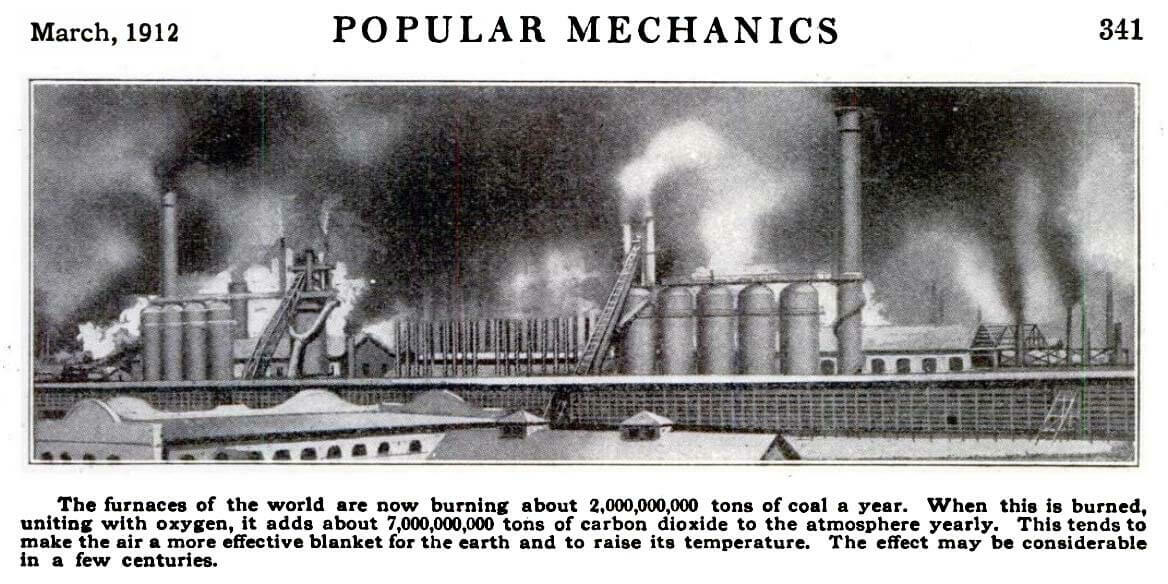
The impact of the greenhouse effect on climate was presented to the public early in the 20th century, as succinctly described in this 1912 Popular Mechanics article.

=== Paleoclimates and sunspots, early 1900s to 1950s ===
Arrhenius's calculations were disputed and subsumed into a larger debate over whether atmospheric changes had caused the ice ages. Experimental attempts to measure infrared absorption in the laboratory seemed to show little differences resulted from increasing CO_{2} levels, and also found significant overlap between absorption by CO_{2} and absorption by water vapor, all of which suggested that increasing carbon dioxide emissions would have little climatic effect. These early experiments were later found to be insufficiently accurate, given the instrumentation of the time. Many scientists also thought that the oceans would quickly absorb any excess carbon dioxide.

Other theories of the causes of climate change fared no better. The principal advances were in observational paleoclimatology, as scientists in various fields of geology worked out methods to reveal ancient climates. In 1929, Wilmot H. Bradley found that annual varves of clay laid down in lake beds showed climate cycles. Andrew Ellicott Douglass saw strong indications of climate change in tree rings. Noting that the rings were thinner in dry years, he reported climate effects from solar variations, particularly in connection with the 17th-century dearth of sunspots (the Maunder Minimum) noticed previously by William Herschel and others. Other scientists, however, found good reason to doubt that tree rings could reveal anything beyond random regional variations. The value of tree rings for climate study was not solidly established until the 1960s.

Through the 1930s the most persistent advocate of a solar-climate connection was astrophysicist Charles Greeley Abbot. By the early 1920s, he had concluded that the solar "constant" was misnamed: his observations showed large variations, which he connected with sunspots passing across the face of the Sun. He and a few others pursued the topic into the 1960s, convinced that sunspot variations were a main cause of climate change. Other scientists were skeptical. Nevertheless, attempts to connect the solar cycle with climate cycles were popular in the 1920s and 1930s. Respected scientists announced correlations that they insisted were reliable enough to make predictions. Sooner or later, every prediction failed, and the subject fell into disrepute.

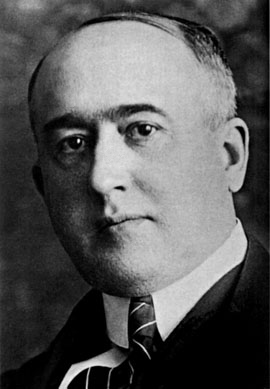
Milutin Milanković

Meanwhile, Milutin Milankovitch, building on James Croll's theory, improved the tedious calculations of the varying distances and angles of the Sun's radiation as the Sun and Moon gradually perturbed the Earth's orbit. Some observations of varves (layers seen in the mud covering the bottom of lakes) matched the prediction of a Milankovitch cycle lasting about 21,000 years. However, most geologists dismissed the astronomical theory. For they could not fit Milankovitch's timing to the accepted sequence, which had only four ice ages, all of them much longer than 21,000 years.

In 1938 Guy Stewart Callendar attempted to revive Arrhenius's greenhouse-effect theory. Callendar presented evidence that both temperature and the CO_{2} level in the atmosphere had been rising over the past half-century, and he argued that newer spectroscopic measurements showed that the gas was effective in absorbing infrared in the atmosphere. Nevertheless, most scientific opinion continued to dispute or ignore the theory.

=== Increasing concern, 1950s–1960s ===
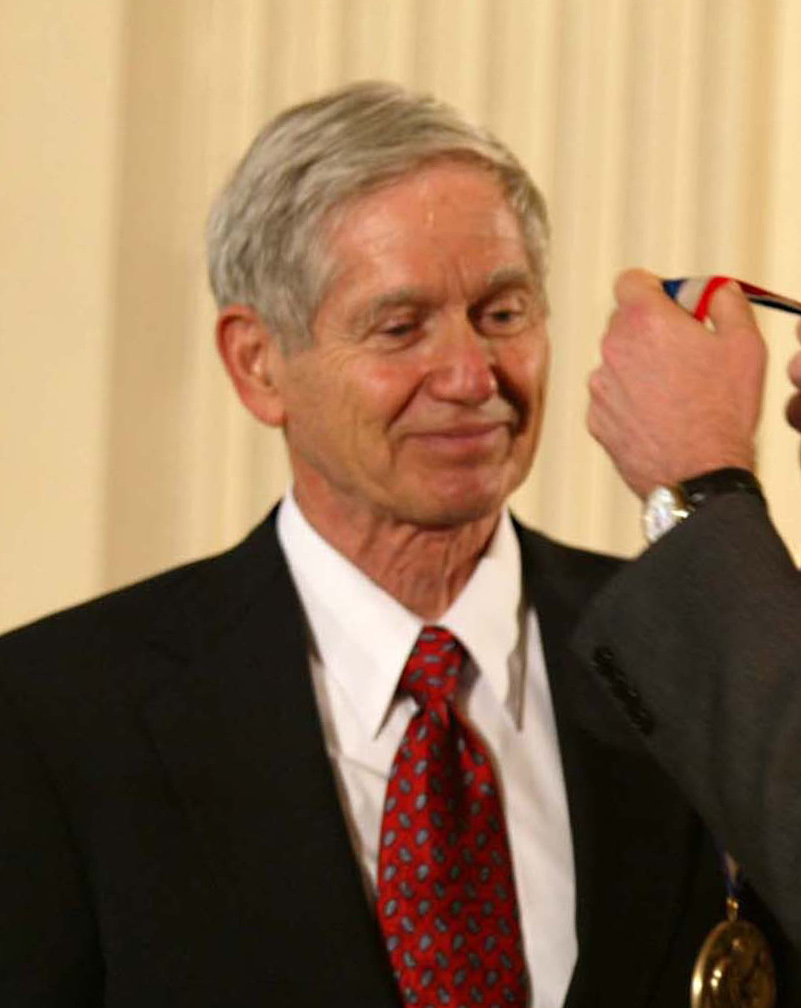
Charles Keeling, receiving the National Medal of Science from George W. Bush, in 2001

Better spectrography in the 1950s showed that CO_{2} and water vapor absorption lines did not overlap completely. Climatologists also realized that little water vapor was present in the upper atmosphere. Both developments showed that the CO_{2} greenhouse effect would not be overwhelmed by water vapor.

In 1955, Hans Suess's carbon-14 isotope analysis showed that CO_{2} released from fossil fuels was not immediately absorbed by the ocean. In 1956, Gilbert Plass published the results of his landmark research on the relationship between atmospheric CO_{2} and global average temperature. His results indicated that a doubling of CO_{2} would warm the planet by 3.6 °C. In 1957, better understanding of ocean chemistry led Roger Revelle to a realization that the ocean surface layer had limited ability to absorb carbon dioxide, also predicting the rise in levels of CO_{2} and later being proven by Charles David Keeling. By the late 1950s, more scientists were arguing that carbon dioxide emissions could be a problem, with some projecting in 1959 that CO_{2} would rise 25% by the year 2000, with potentially "radical" effects on climate.

In the centennial of the American oil industry in 1959, organized by the American Petroleum Institute and the Columbia Graduate School of Business, Edward Teller said "It has been calculated that a temperature rise corresponding to a 10 per cent increase in carbon dioxide will be sufficient to melt the icecap and submerge New York. ... At present the carbon dioxide in the atmosphere has risen by 2 per cent over normal. By 1970, it will be perhaps 4 per cent, by 1980, 8 per cent, by 1990, 16 per cent if we keep on with our exponential rise in the use of purely conventional fuels." In 1960 Charles David Keeling demonstrated that the level of CO_{2} in the atmosphere was in fact rising. Concern mounted year by year along with the rise of the "Keeling Curve" of atmospheric CO_{2}.

Another clue to the nature of climate change came in the mid-1960s from analysis of deep-sea cores by Cesare Emiliani and analysis of ancient corals by Wallace Broecker and collaborators. Rather than four long ice ages, they found a large number of shorter ones in a regular sequence. It appeared that the timing of ice ages was set by the small orbital shifts of the Milankovitch cycles. While the matter remained controversial, some began to suggest that the climate system is sensitive to small changes and can readily be flipped from a stable state into an instable one.

Scientists meanwhile began using computers to develop more sophisticated versions of Arrhenius's calculations. In 1967, taking advantage of the ability of digital computers to integrate absorption curves numerically, Syukuro Manabe and Richard Wetherald made the first detailed calculation of the greenhouse effect incorporating convection (the "Manabe-Wetherald one-dimensional radiative-convective model"). They found that, in the absence of unknown feedbacks such as changes in clouds, a doubling of carbon dioxide from the current level would result in approximately 2 °C increase in global temperature. For this, and related work, Manabe was awarded a share of the 2021 Nobel Prize in Physics.

By the 1960s, aerosol pollution ("smog") had become a serious local problem in many cities, and some scientists began to consider whether the cooling effect of particulate pollution could affect global temperatures. Scientists were unsure whether the cooling effect of particulate pollution or warming effect of greenhouse gas emissions would predominate, but regardless, began to suspect that human emissions could be disruptive to climate in the 21st century if not sooner. In his 1968 book The Population Bomb, Paul R. Ehrlich wrote, "the greenhouse effect is being enhanced now by the greatly increased level of carbon dioxide ... [this] is being countered by low-level clouds generated by contrails, dust, and other contaminants ... At the moment we cannot predict what the overall climatic results will be of our using the atmosphere as a garbage dump."

Efforts to establish a global temperature record that began in 1938 culminated in 1963, when J. Murray Mitchell presented one of the first up-to-date temperature reconstructions. His study involved data from over 200 weather stations, collected by the World Weather Records, which was used to calculate latitudinal average temperature. In his presentation, Murray showed that, beginning in 1880, global temperatures increased steadily until 1940. After that, a multi-decade cooling trend emerged. Murray's work contributed to the overall acceptance of a possible global cooling trend.

In 1965, the landmark report "Restoring the Quality of Our Environment" by U.S. President Lyndon B. Johnson's Science Advisory Committee warned of the harmful effects of fossil fuel emissions:

The part that remains in the atmosphere may have a significant effect on climate; carbon dioxide is nearly transparent to visible light, but it is a strong absorber and back radiator of infrared radiation, particularly in the wave lengths from 12 to 18 microns; consequently, an increase of atmospheric carbon dioxide could act, much like the glass in a greenhouse, to raise the temperature of the lower air.

The committee used the recently available global temperature reconstructions and carbon dioxide data from Charles David Keeling and colleagues to reach their conclusions. They declared the rise of atmospheric carbon dioxide levels to be the direct result of fossil fuel burning. The committee concluded that human activities were sufficiently large to have significant, global impact—beyond the area the activities take place. "Man is unwittingly conducting a vast geophysical experiment", the committee wrote.

In 1966, Nobel Prize winner Glenn T. Seaborg, Chairperson of the United States Atomic Energy Commission warned of the climate crisis: "At the rate we are currently adding carbon dioxide to our atmosphere (six billion tons a year), within the next few decades the heat balance of the atmosphere could be altered enough to produce marked changes in the climate—changes which we might have no means of controlling even if by that time we have made great advances in our programs of weather modification."

1969 Memorandum to Richard Nixon's
White House Counsel John Ehrlichman

Carbon dioxide in the atmosphere has the effect of a pane of glass in a greenhouse. The CO_{2} content is normally in a stable cycle, but recently man has begun to introduce instability through the burning of fossil fuels. ... It is now pretty clearly agreed that the CO_{2} content will rise 25% by 2000. This could increase the average temperature near the earth's surface by 7 °F (3.9 °C). This in turn could raise the level of the sea by 10 feet. Goodbye New York. Goodbye Washington, for that matter. We have no data on Seattle.

— Daniel Patrick Moynihan, 17 September 1969

White House Urban Affairs Director,
discussing the greenhouse effect and
urging building of a monitoring system

(Click {} to view memo)

A 1968 study by the Stanford Research Institute for the American Petroleum Institute noted:

If the earth's temperature increases significantly, a number of events might be expected to occur, including the melting of the Antarctic ice cap, a rise in sea levels, warming of the oceans, and an increase in photosynthesis. ... Revelle makes the point that man is now engaged in a vast geophysical experiment with his environment, the earth. Significant temperature changes are almost certain to occur by the year 2000 and these could bring about climatic changes.

In 1969, NATO was the first candidate to deal with climate change on an international level. It was planned then to establish a hub of research and initiatives of the organization in the civil area, dealing with environmental topics as acid rain and the greenhouse effect. The suggestion of US President Richard Nixon was not very successful with the administration of German Chancellor Kiesinger. But the topics and the preparation work done on the NATO proposal by German authorities gained international momentum, (see e.g. the Stockholm United Nations Conference on the Human Environment 1970) as the government of Willy Brandt started to apply them on the civil sphere instead.

Also in 1969, Mikhail Budyko published a theory on the ice–albedo feedback, a foundational element of what is today known as Arctic amplification. The same year a similar model was published by William D. Sellers. Both studies attracted significant attention, since they hinted at the possibility for a runaway positive feedback within the global climate system.

A 1969 memo from White House Urban Affairs Director Daniel Patrick Moynihan tried to impress the office of U.S. President Nixon with the projected severity of the greenhouse effect. However, action was not taken, even after a 20 December 1971 initiative from the Office of Science and Technology, "Determine the Climate Change Caused by Man and Nature". In the initiative, Nixon's science advisors recommended an international network for monitoring climate trends and human impact on it.

=== Scientists increasingly predict warming, 1970s ===
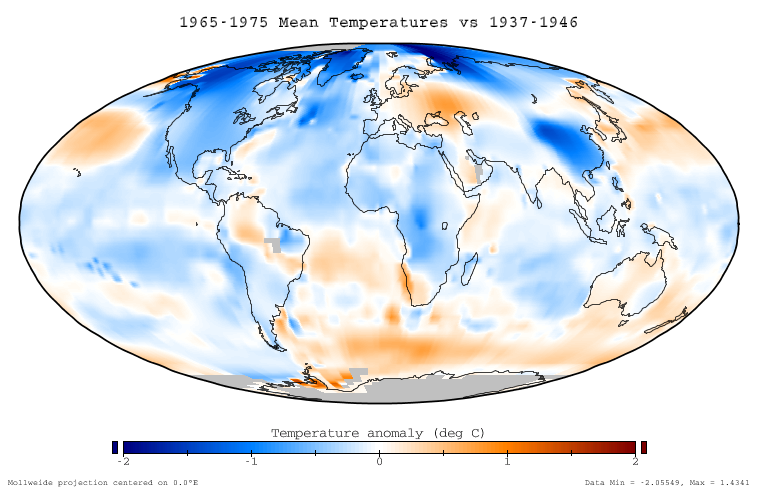
Mean temperature anomalies during the period 1965 to 1975 with respect to the average temperatures from 1937 to 1946. This dataset was not available at the time.

Anthropogenic global warming—not global cooling or "imminent ice ages"—dominated peer-reviewed literature in the 1970s, contrary to false claims that climate science subsequently reversed its consensus.

In the early 1970s, evidence that aerosols were increasing worldwide and that the global temperature series showed cooling encouraged Reid Bryson and some others to warn of the possibility of severe cooling. The questions and concerns put forth by Bryson and others launched a new wave of research into the factors of such global cooling. Meanwhile, the new evidence that the timing of ice ages was set by predictable orbital cycles suggested that the climate would gradually cool, over thousands of years. Several scientific panels from this time period concluded that more research was needed to determine whether warming or cooling was likely, indicating that the trend in the scientific literature had not yet become a consensus. For the century ahead, however, a survey of the scientific literature from 1965 to 1979 found 7 articles predicting cooling and 44 predicting warming (many other articles on climate made no prediction); the warming articles were cited much more often in subsequent scientific literature. Research into warming and greenhouse gases held the greater emphasis, with nearly six times more studies predicting warming than predicting cooling, suggesting concern among scientists was largely over warming as they turned their attention toward the greenhouse effect.

John Sawyer published the study Man-made Carbon Dioxide and the "Greenhouse" Effect in 1972. He summarized the knowledge of the science at the time, the anthropogenic attribution of the carbon dioxide greenhouse gas, distribution and exponential rise, findings which still hold today. Additionally he accurately predicted the rate of global warming for the period between 1972 and 2000.

The increase of 25% CO_{2} expected by the end of the century therefore corresponds to an increase of 0.6 °C in the world temperature – an amount somewhat greater than the climatic variation of recent centuries. – John Sawyer, 1972

The first satellite records compiled in the early 1970s showed snow and ice cover over the Northern Hemisphere to be increasing, prompting further scrutiny into the possibility of global cooling. J. Murray Mitchell updated his global temperature reconstruction in 1972, which continued to show cooling. However, scientists determined that the cooling observed by Mitchell was not a global phenomenon. Global averages were changing, largely in part due to unusually severe winters experienced by Asia and some parts of North America in 1972 and 1973, but these changes were mostly constrained to the Northern Hemisphere. In the Southern Hemisphere, the opposite trend was observed. The severe winters, however, pushed the issue of global cooling into the public eye.

The mainstream news media at the time exaggerated the warnings of the minority who expected imminent cooling. For example, in 1975, Newsweek magazine published a story titled "The Cooling World" that warned of "ominous signs that the Earth's weather patterns have begun to change". The article drew on studies documenting the increasing snow and ice in regions of the Northern Hemisphere and concerns and claims by Reid Bryson that global cooling by aerosols would dominate carbon dioxide warming. The article continued by stating that evidence of global cooling was so strong that meteorologists were having "a hard time keeping up with it". On 23 October 2006, Newsweek issued an update stating that it had been "spectacularly wrong about the near-term future". Nevertheless, this article and others like it had long-lasting effects on public perception of climate science.

1977 Memorandum to the President:
Release of Fossil CO_{2} and the
Possibility of a Catastrophic Climate Change

(within 60 years:) Because of the "greenhouse effect" of atmospheric CO_{2} the increased concentration will induce a global climatic warming of anywhere from 0.5 to 5 °C.
... The potential effect on the environment of a climatic fluctuation of such rapidity could be catastrophic and calls for an impact assessment of unprecedented importance and difficulty. A rapid climatic change may result in large scale crop failures at a time when an increased world population taxes agriculture to the limits of productivity.
... The urgency of the problem derives from our inability to shift rapidly to non-fossil fuel sources once the climatic effects become evident not long after the year 2000; ...

— Frank Press, 7 July 1977
Chief science adviser to U.S. President Carter

Such media coverage heralding the coming of a new ice age resulted in beliefs that this was the consensus among scientists, despite this not being reflected by the scientific literature. As it became apparent that scientific opinion was in favor of global warming, the public began to express doubt over how trustworthy the science was. The argument that scientists were wrong about global cooling, so therefore may be wrong about global warming has been called "the Ice Age Fallacy" by Time author Bryan Walsh.

In the first two "Reports for the Club of Rome" in 1972 and 1974, the anthropogenic climate changes by CO_{2} increase as well as by waste heat were mentioned. About the latter John Holdren wrote in a study cited in the 1st report, "that global thermal pollution is hardly our most immediate environmental threat. It could prove to be the most inexorable, however, if we are fortunate enough to evade all the rest". Simple global-scale estimates that recently have been actualized and confirmed by more refined model calculations show noticeable contributions from waste heat to global warming after the year 2100, if its growth rates are not strongly reduced (below the averaged 2% p.a. which occurred since 1973).

Evidence for warming accumulated. By 1975, Manabe and Wetherald had developed a three-dimensional global climate model that gave a roughly accurate representation of the current climate. Doubling CO_{2} in the model's atmosphere gave a roughly 2 °C rise in global temperature. Several other kinds of computer models gave similar results: it was impossible to make a model that gave something resembling the actual climate and not have the temperature rise when the CO_{2} concentration was increased.

In a separate development, an analysis of deep-sea cores published in 1976 by Nicholas Shackleton and colleagues showed that the dominating influence on ice age timing came from a 100,000-year Milankovitch orbital change. This was unexpected, since the change in sunlight in that cycle was slight. The result emphasized that the climate system is driven by feedbacks, and thus is strongly susceptible to small changes in conditions.

A 1977 memo (see quote box) from President Carter's chief science adviser Frank Press warned of the possibility of catastrophic climate change. However, other issues—such as known harms to health from pollutants, and avoiding energy dependence on other nations—seemed more pressing and immediate. Energy Secretary James Schlesinger advised that "the policy implications of this issue are still too uncertain to warrant Presidential involvement and policy initiatives", and the fossil fuel industry began sowing doubt about climate science.

The 1979 World Climate Conference (12 to 23 February) of the World Meteorological Organization concluded "it appears plausible that an increased amount of carbon dioxide in the atmosphere can contribute to a gradual warming of the lower atmosphere, especially at higher latitudes. ... It is possible that some effects on a regional and global scale may be detectable before the end of this century and become significant before the middle of the next century."

In July 1979 the United States National Research Council published a report, concluding (in part):

When it is assumed that the CO_{2} content of the atmosphere is doubled and statistical thermal equilibrium is achieved, the more realistic of the modeling efforts predict a global surface warming of between 2 °C and 3.5 °C, with greater increases at high latitudes. ... we have tried but have been unable to find any overlooked or underestimated physical effects that could reduce the currently estimated global warmings due to a doubling of atmospheric CO_{2} to negligible proportions or reverse them altogether.

One week before President Carter left office, the White House Council on Environmental Quality (CEQ) issued reports including a suggestion to limit global average temperature to 2 °C above preindustrial levels, one goal agreed to in the 2015 Paris climate accord.

=== Consensus begins to form, 1980–1988 ===
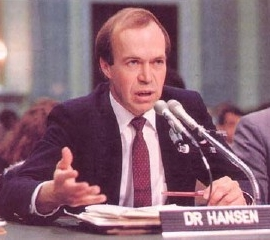
James Hansen during his 1988 testimony to Congress, which alerted the public to the dangers of global warming

By the early 1980s, the slight cooling trend from 1945 to 1975 had stopped. Aerosol pollution had decreased in many areas due to environmental legislation and changes in fuel use, and it became clear that the cooling effect from aerosols was not going to increase substantially while carbon dioxide levels were progressively increasing.

Hansen and others published the 1981 study Climate impact of increasing atmospheric carbon dioxide, and noted:

It is shown that the anthropogenic carbon dioxide warming should emerge from the noise level of natural climate variability by the end of the century, and there is a high probability of warming in the 1980s. Potential effects on climate in the 21st century include the creation of drought-prone regions in North America and central Asia as part of a shifting of climatic zones, erosion of the West Antarctic ice sheet with a consequent worldwide rise in sea level, and opening of the fabled Northwest Passage.

In 1982, Greenland ice cores drilled by Hans Oeschger, Willi Dansgaard, and collaborators revealed dramatic temperature oscillations in the space of a century in the distant past. The most prominent of the changes in their record corresponded to the violent Younger Dryas climate oscillation seen in shifts in types of pollen in lake beds all over Europe. Evidently drastic climate changes were possible within a human lifetime.

In 1973 James Lovelock speculated that chlorofluorocarbons (CFCs) could have a global warming effect. In 1975 V. Ramanathan found that a CFC molecule could be 10,000 times more effective in absorbing infrared radiation than a carbon dioxide molecule, making CFCs potentially important despite their very low concentrations in the atmosphere. While most early work on CFCs focused on their role in ozone depletion, by 1985 Ramanathan and others showed that CFCs together with methane and other trace gases could have nearly as important a climate effect as increases in CO_{2}. In other words, global warming would arrive twice as fast as had been expected.

Since the 1980s, global average surface temperatures during a given decade have almost always been higher than the average temperature in the preceding decade.

In 1985 a joint UNEP/WMO/ICSU Conference on the "Assessment of the Role of Carbon Dioxide and Other Greenhouse Gases in Climate Variations and Associated Impacts" concluded that greenhouse gases "are expected" to cause significant warming in the next century and that some warming is inevitable.

Meanwhile, ice cores drilled by a Franco-Soviet team at the Vostok Station in Antarctica showed that CO_{2} and temperature had gone up and down together in wide swings through past ice ages. This confirmed the CO_{2}-temperature relationship in a manner entirely independent of computer climate models, strongly reinforcing the emerging scientific consensus. The findings also pointed to powerful biological and geochemical feedbacks.

In January 1986, the German Physical Society published warning of an impending climate catastrophe

In June 1988, James E. Hansen made one of the first assessments that human-caused warming had already measurably affected global climate. Shortly after, a "World Conference on the Changing Atmosphere: Implications for Global Security" gathered hundreds of scientists and others in Toronto. They concluded that the changes in the atmosphere due to human pollution "represent a major threat to international security and are already having harmful consequences over many parts of the globe", and declared that by 2005 the world would be well-advised to push its emissions some 20% below the 1988 level.

The 1980s saw important breakthroughs with regard to global environmental challenges. Ozone depletion was mitigated by the Vienna Convention (1985) and the Montreal Protocol (1987). Acid rain was mainly regulated on national and regional levels.

=== Increased consensus amongst scientists: 1988 to present ===
Scientific consensus on causation: Academic studies of scientific agreement on human-caused global warming among climate experts (2010–2015) reflect that the level of consensus correlates with expertise in climate science. A 2019 study found scientific consensus to be at 100%, and a 2021 study concluded that consensus exceeded 99%. Another 2021 study found that 98.7% of climate experts indicated that the Earth is getting warmer mostly because of human activity.

In 1988 the WMO established the Intergovernmental Panel on Climate Change with the support of the UNEP. The IPCC continues its work through the present day, and issues a series of Assessment Reports and supplemental reports that describe the state of scientific understanding at the time each report is prepared. Scientific developments during this period are summarized about once every five to six years in the IPCC Assessment Reports which were published in 1990 (First Assessment Report), 1995 (Second Assessment Report), 2001 (Third Assessment Report), 2007 (Fourth Assessment Report), 2013/2014 (Fifth Assessment Report). and 2021 Sixth Assessment Report The 2001 report was the first to state positively that the observed global temperature increase was "likely" to be due to human activities. The conclusion was influenced especially by the so-called hockey stick graph showing an abrupt historical temperature rise simultaneous with the rise of greenhouse gas emissions, and by observations of changes in ocean heat content that had a "signature" matching the pattern that computer models calculated for the effect of greenhouse warming. By the time of the 2021 report, scientists had much additional evidence. Above all, measurements of paleotemperatures from several eras in the distant past, and the record of temperature change since the mid 19th century, could be matched against measurements of CO_{2} levels to provide independent confirmation of supercomputer model calculations.

These developments depended crucially on Weather satellites, other satellites and huge globe-spanning observation programs. Since the 1990s research into historical and modern climate change expanded rapidly. International coordination was provided by the World Climate Research Programme (established in 1980) and was increasingly oriented around providing input to the IPCC reports. Measurement networks such as the Global Ocean Observing System, Integrated Carbon Observation System, and NASA's Earth Observing System enabled monitoring of the causes and effects of ongoing change. Research also broadened, linking many fields such as Earth sciences, behavioral sciences, economics, and security.

=== Relative importance of human activity versus natural causes ===
A historically important question in climate change research has regarded the relative importance of human activity and natural causes during the period of instrumental record. In the 1995 Second Assessment Report (SAR), the IPCC made the widely quoted statement that "The balance of evidence suggests a discernible human influence on global climate". The phrase "balance of evidence" suggested the (English) common-law standard of proof required in civil as opposed to criminal courts: not as high as "beyond reasonable doubt". In 2001 the Third Assessment Report (TAR) refined this, saying "There is new and stronger evidence that most of the warming observed over the last 50 years is attributable to human activities". The 2007 Fourth Assessment Report (AR4) strengthened this finding:

- "Anthropogenic warming of the climate system is widespread and can be detected in temperature observations taken at the surface, in the free atmosphere and in the oceans. Evidence of the effect of external influences, both anthropogenic and natural, on the climate system has continued to accumulate since the TAR."

Other findings of the IPCC Fourth Assessment Report include:

- "It is extremely unlikely (<5%) that the global pattern of warming during the past half century can be explained without external forcing (i.e., it is inconsistent with being the result of internal variability), and very unlikely that it is due to known natural external causes alone. The warming occurred in both the ocean and the atmosphere and took place at a time when natural external forcing factors would likely have produced cooling."
- "From new estimates of the combined anthropogenic forcing due to greenhouse gases, aerosols, and land surface changes, it is extremely likely (>95%) that human activities have exerted a substantial net warming influence on climate since 1750."
- "It is virtually certain that anthropogenic aerosols produce a net negative radiative forcing (cooling influence) with a greater magnitude in the Northern Hemisphere than in the Southern Hemisphere."

Some results from scientific studies on this issue are listed below:

- In 1996, in a paper in Nature titled "A search for human influences on the thermal structure of the atmosphere", Benjamin D. Santer et al. wrote: "The observed spatial patterns of temperature change in the free atmosphere from 1963 to 1987 are similar to those predicted by state-of-the-art climate models incorporating various combinations of changes in carbon dioxide, anthropogenic sulphate aerosol and stratospheric ozone concentrations. The degree of pattern similarity between models and observations increases through this period. It is likely that this trend is partially due to human activities, although many uncertainties remain, particularly relating to estimates of natural variability."
- A 2002 paper in the Journal of Geophysical Research says "Our analysis suggests that the early twentieth century warming can best be explained by a combination of warming due to increases in greenhouse gases and natural forcing, some cooling due to other anthropogenic forcings, and a substantial, but not implausible, contribution from internal variability. In the second half of the century we find that the warming is largely caused by changes in greenhouse gases, with changes in sulphates and, perhaps, volcanic aerosol offsetting approximately one third of the warming."
- A 2005 review of detection and attribution studies by the International Ad hoc Detection and Attribution Group found that "natural drivers such as solar variability and volcanic activity are at most partially responsible for the large-scale temperature changes observed over the past century, and that a large fraction of the warming over the last 50 yr can be attributed to greenhouse gas increases. Thus, the recent research supports and strengthens the IPCC Third Assessment Report conclusion that 'most of the global warming over the past 50 years is likely due to the increase in greenhouse gases.'"
- Barnett and colleagues (2005) say that the observed warming of the oceans "cannot be explained by natural internal climate variability or solar and volcanic forcing, but is well simulated by two anthropogenically forced climate models," concluding that "it is of human origin, a conclusion robust to observational sampling and model differences".
- Two papers in the journal Science in August 2005 resolve the problem, evident at the time of the TAR, of tropospheric temperature trends. The UAH version of the record contained errors, and there is evidence of spurious cooling trends in the radiosonde record, particularly in the tropics. See satellite temperature measurements for details; and the 2006 US CCSP report.

=== Extreme event attribution ===
Extreme event attribution methods generally involve applying climate change models to scenarios in both the "real" world that is experiencing global warming, and a simulated world that does not suffer the drivers of global warming. Differences between the results of the two processes—especially the frequency, intensity and impacts of extreme weather events—are then analyzed to arrive at the attribution result.

Extreme event attribution (EEA), also known as attribution science, was developed in the early decades of the 21st century. EEA uses climate models to identify and quantify the role that human-caused climate change plays in the frequency, intensity, duration, and impacts of specific individual extreme weather events. Results of attribution studies allow scientists and journalists to make statements such as, "this weather event was made at least n times more likely by human-caused climate change" or "this heatwave was made m degrees hotter than it would have been in a world without global warming" or "this event was effectively impossible without climate change".

A common EEA approach uses model simulations to compare events in two worlds—a first world with human-caused greenhouse gas emissions and a second world without such emissions—and attributing differences to human influence. Greater computing power of the 2000s allowed weather to be simulated over and over again, and conceptual breakthroughs in the early to mid 2010s enabled attribution science to detect the effects of climate change on some events with high confidence. Scientists use methods that have already been peer reviewed, allowing "rapid attribution" studies to be published within a "news cycle" time frame.

=== Terminology ===
Terms like "climate emergency" and climate crisis" have often been used by activists, and are increasingly found in academic papers.

Before the 1980s, it was unclear whether the warming effect of increased greenhouse gases was stronger than the cooling effect of airborne particulates in air pollution. Scientists used the term inadvertent climate modification to refer to human impacts on the climate at this time. In the 1980s, the terms global warming and climate change became more common, often being used interchangeably. Scientifically, global warming refers only to increased global average surface temperature, while climate change describes both global warming and its effects on Earth's climate system, such as precipitation changes.

Climate change can also be used more broadly to include changes to the climate that have happened throughout Earth's history as result of natural processes. The term anthropogenic climate change is sometimes used to describe climate change resulting from human activities.

Global warming—used as early as 1975—became the more popular term after NASA climate scientist James Hansen used it in his 1988 testimony in the U.S. Senate. Since the 2000s, usage of climate change has increased. Various scientists, politicians and media may use the terms climate crisis or climate emergency to talk about climate change, and may use the term global heating instead of global warming.

== Discredited theories and reconciled apparent discrepancies ==
=== Analogy of the greenhouse effect to the atmosphere ===
The early work of Joseph Fourier found that a greenhouse heats up mainly due to radiation trapping. This is analogous to radiation trapping in the atmosphere, leading to the term "greenhouse effect".

An experiment performed by Prof. R. W. Wood in 1909 led him to reject radiation trapping, claiming that a greenhouse is heated merely due to convection blocking. This theory became a widespread view in the scientific community.

Moreover, Wood's theory has been used to reject the analogy, and to doubt the existence of a greenhouse effect in the atmosphere.
Experiments have discredited Wood's theory. They have confirmed that radiation trapping is indeed the dominant cause of heating in a greenhouse. Hence the analogy is valid.

=== Discussions around locations of temperature measurement stations ===
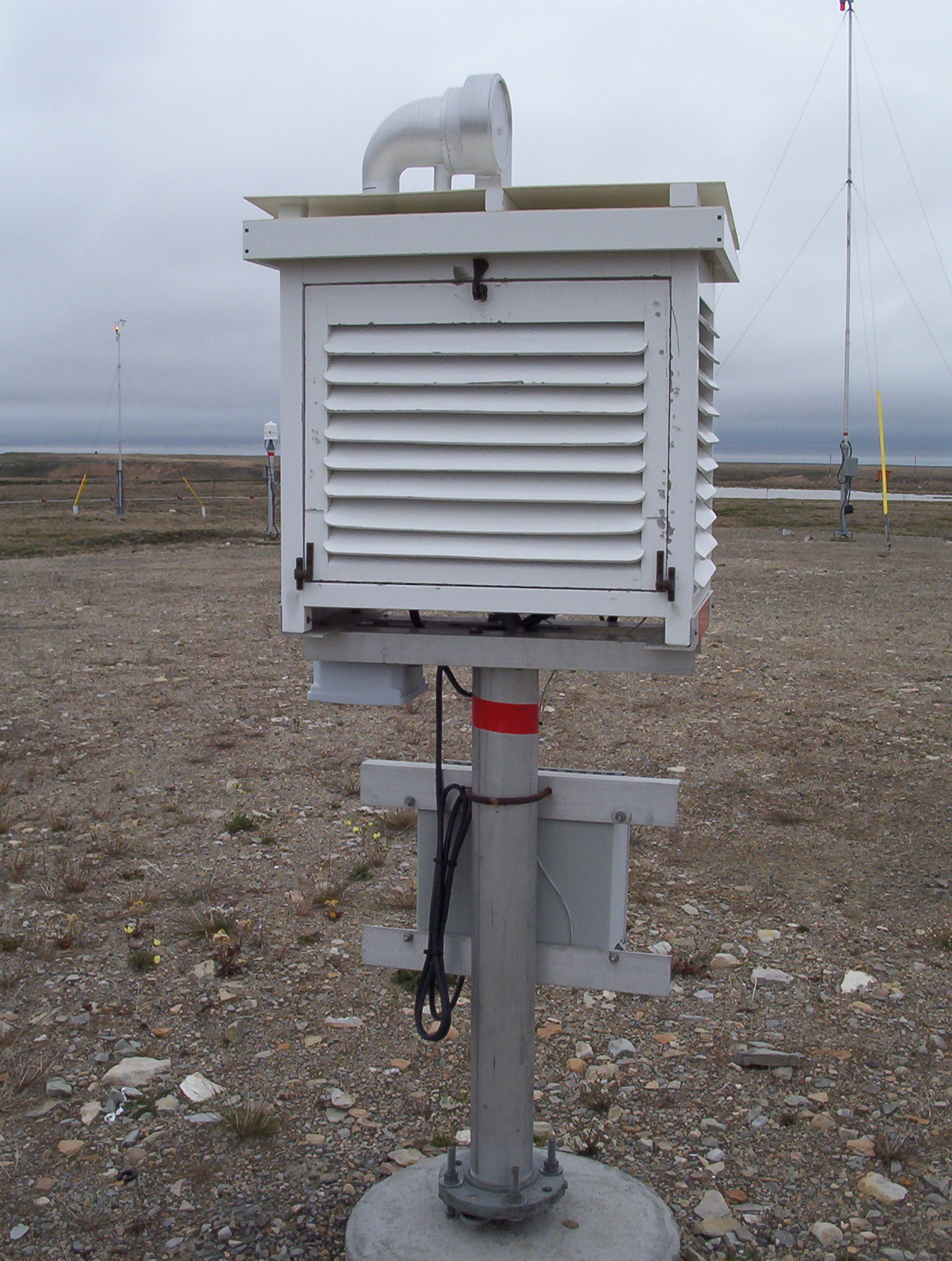
Exterior of a Stevenson screen used for temperature measurements on land stations.

There have been attempts to raise public controversy over the accuracy of the instrumental temperature record on the basis of the urban heat island effect, the quality of the surface station network, and assertions that there have been unwarranted adjustments to the temperature record.

Weather stations that are used to compute global temperature records are not evenly distributed over the planet, and their distribution has changed over time. There were a small number of weather stations in the 1850s, and the number did not reach the current 3000+ until the 1951 to 1990 period

The 2001 IPCC Third Assessment Report (TAR) acknowledged that the urban heat island is an important local effect, but cited analyses of historical data indicating that the effect of the urban heat island on the global temperature trend is no more than 0.05 °C (0.09 °F) degrees through 1990. Peterson (2003) found no difference between the warming observed in urban and rural areas.

Parker (2006) found that there was no difference in warming between calm and windy nights. Since the urban heat island effect is strongest for calm nights and is weak or absent on windy nights, this was taken as evidence that global temperature trends are not significantly contaminated by urban effects. Pielke and Matsui published a paper disagreeing with Parker's conclusions.

In 2005, Roger A. Pielke and Stephen McIntyre criticized the US instrumental temperature record and adjustments to it, and Pielke and others criticized the poor quality siting of a number of weather stations in the United States. A study in 2010 examined the siting of temperature stations and found that those measurement stations that were poorly showed a slight cool bias rather than the warm bias which deniers had postulated.

The Berkeley Earth Surface Temperature group carried out an independent assessment of land temperature records, which examined issues raised by deniers, such as the urban heat island effect, poor station quality, and the risk of data selection bias. The preliminary results, made public in October 2011, found that these factors had not biased the results obtained by NOAA, the Hadley Centre together with the Climatic Research Unit (HadCRUT) and NASA's GISS in earlier studies. The group also confirmed that over the past 50 years the land surface warmed by 0.911 °C, and their results closely matched those obtained from these earlier studies.

=== Apparent discrepancy for tropospheric temperature increases in the tropics ===
General circulation models and basic physical considerations predict that in the tropics the temperature of the troposphere should increase more rapidly than the temperature of the surface. A 2006 report to the U.S. Climate Change Science Program noted that models and observations agreed on this amplification for monthly and interannual time scales but not for decadal time scales in most observed data sets. Improved measurement and analysis techniques have reconciled this discrepancy: corrected buoy and satellite surface temperatures are slightly cooler and corrected satellite and radiosonde measurements of the tropical troposphere are slightly warmer. Satellite temperature measurements show that tropospheric temperatures are increasing with "rates similar to those of the surface temperature", leading the IPCC to conclude in 2007 that this discrepancy is reconciled.

=== Iris hypothesis ===
The iris hypothesis was a hypothesis proposed by Richard Lindzen and colleagues in 2001 that suggested increased sea surface temperature in the tropics would result in reduced cirrus clouds and thus more infrared radiation leakage from Earth's atmosphere. His study of observed changes in cloud coverage and modeled effects on infrared radiation released to space as a result seemed to support the hypothesis. This suggested infrared radiation leakage was hypothesized to be a negative feedback in which an initial warming would result in an overall cooling of the surface.

The idea of the iris effect of cirrus clouds in trapping outgoing radiation was reasonable, but it ignored the larger compensating effect on the blocking of incoming sun's rays, and effects of changes in altitude of clouds. Moreover, a number of errors were found in the papers. For this reason, the iris effect no longer plays a role in the current scientific consensus on climate change.

=== Apparent "Antarctica cooling" discrepancy ===
Antarctica is the coldest, driest continent on Earth, and has the highest average elevation. Antarctica's dryness means the air contains little water vapor and conducts heat poorly. The Southern Ocean surrounding the continent is far more effective at absorbing heat than any other ocean. The presence of extensive, year-round sea ice, which has a high albedo (reflectivity), adds to the albedo of the ice sheets' own bright, white surface. Antarctica's coldness makes it the only place on Earth to have an atmospheric temperature inversion occur every winter; elsewhere on Earth, the atmosphere is at its warmest near the surface and becomes cooler as elevation increases. During the Antarctic winter, the surface of central Antarctica becomes cooler than middle layers of the atmosphere, which makes greenhouse gases trap heat in the middle atmosphere, and reduce its flow toward the surface and toward space, rather than preventing the flow of heat from the lower atmosphere to the upper layers. The effect lasts until the end of the Antarctic winter. Early climate models predicted temperature trends over Antarctica would emerge more slowly and be more subtle than those elsewhere.

There were fewer than twenty permanent weather stations across the continent and only two in the continent's interior. Automatic weather stations were deployed relatively late, and their observational record was brief for much of the 20th century satellite temperature measurements began in 1981 and are typically limited to cloud-free conditions. Thus, datasets representing the entire continent had begun to appear only by the very end of the 20th century. The exception was the Antarctic Peninsula, where warming was pronounced and well-documented; it was eventually found to have warmed by 3 °C (5.4 °F) since the mid 20th century. Based on those limited data, several papers published in the early 2000s said there had been an overall cooling over continental Antarctica outside the Peninsula. In particular, a 2002 analysis led by Peter Doran indicated stronger cooling than warming over Antarctica between 1966 and 2000, and found the McMurdo Dry Valleys in East Antarctica had experienced cooling of 0.7 °C per decade. The paper noted that its data was limited, and it still found warming over 42% of the continent.

Nevertheless, the paper received widespread media coverage, as multiple journalists described those findings as "contradictory" to global warming, which was criticized by scientists at the time. The "controversy" around the cooling of Antarctica received further attention in 2004 when Michael Crichton wrote the novel State of Fear. The novel featured a fictional conspiracy among climate scientists to fake evidence of global warming, and cited Doran's study as proof that there was no warming in Antarctica outside of the Peninsula. That novel was mentioned in a 2006 US Senate hearing in support of climate change denial, and Peter Doran published a statement in The New York Times decrying the misinterpretation of his work. The British Antarctic Survey and NASA also issued statements affirming the strength of climate science after the hearing.

By 2009, researchers had combined historical weather-station data with satellite measurements to create consistent temperature records going back to 1957 that demonstrated warming of >0.05 °C per decade across the continent, with cooling in East Antarctica offset by the average temperature increase of at least 0.176 ± 0.06 °C per decade in West Antarctica. That paper was widely reported on, and subsequent research confirmed clear warming over West Antarctica in the 20th century, the only uncertainty being the magnitude. During 2012–2013, estimates based on WAIS Divide ice cores and revised temperature records from Byrd Station suggested a much-larger West-Antarctica warming of 2.4 °C (4.3 °F) since 1958, or around 0.46 °C (0.83 °F) per decade, but some scientists continued to emphasize uncertainty. In 2022, a study narrowed the warming of the Central area of the West Antarctic Ice Sheet between 1959 and 2000 to 0.31 °C (0.56 °F) per decade, and conclusively attributed it to increases in greenhouse gas concentrations caused by human activity. Likewise, the strong cooling at McMurdo Dry Valleys was confirmed to be a local trend.

The Antarctica-wide warming trend continued after 2000, and in February 2020, the continent recorded its highest-ever temperature of 18.3 °C, exceeding the previous record of 17.5 °C in March 2015. The East Antarctica interior also demonstrated clear warming between 2000 and 2020. In particular, the South Pole warmed by 0.61 ± 0.34 °C per decade between 1990 and 2020, which is three times the global average. On the other hand, changes in atmospheric circulation patterns like the Interdecadal Pacific Oscillation (IPO) and the Southern Annular Mode (SAM) slowed or partially reversed the warming of West Antarctica, with the Antarctic Peninsula experiencing cooling from 2002. While a variability in those patterns is natural, past ozone depletion had also led the SAM to be stronger than it had been in the past 600 years of observations. Starting around 2002, studies predicted a reversal in the SAM once the ozone layer began to recover following the Montreal Protocol, and those changes are consistent with their predictions.

Under the most intense climate change scenario, known as RCP8.5, models predict Antarctic surface temperatures to rise by 3 °C (5.4 °F) by 2070 and by 4 °C (7.2 °F) on average by 2100, which will be accompanied by a 30% increase in precipitation and a 30% decrease in sea ice by 2100. The Southern Ocean waters "south of 50° S latitude would also warm by about 1.9 °C (3.4 °F) by 2070. RCPs were developed in the late 2000s, and early 2020s research considers RCP8.5 much less likely than the more-moderate scenarios like RCP 4.5, which lie in between the worst-case scenario and the Paris Agreement goals. If a low-emission scenario mostly consistent with the Paris Agreement goals is followed, then Antarctica would experience surface and ocean warming of less than 1 °C (1.8 °F) by 2070, while less than 15% of sea ice would be lost and precipitation would increase by less than 10%.

=== Solar variation ===
Some climate change deniers have argued that solar variation is a significant contributor to the observed global warming, which would reduce the relative importance of human-made causes. However, this is not supported by scientific consensus on climate change. Scientists reject the notion that the warming observed in the global mean surface temperature record since about 1850 is the result of solar variations: "The observed rapid rise in global mean temperatures seen after 1985 cannot be ascribed to solar variability, whichever of the mechanisms is invoked and no matter how much the solar variation is amplified."

The consensus position is that solar radiation may have increased by 0.12 W/m^{2} since 1750, compared to 1.6 W/m^{2} for the net anthropogenic forcing. Already in 2001, the IPCC Third Assessment Report had found that, "The combined change in radiative forcing of the two major natural factors (solar variation and volcanic aerosols) is estimated to be negative for the past two, and possibly the past four, decades."

Many studies say that the recent level of solar activity was historically high as determined by sunspot activity and other factors. This is known as the "Modern Maximum". Solar activity could affect climate either by variation in the Sun's output or, more speculatively, by an indirect effect on the amount of cloud formation. Solanki and co-workers suggest that solar activity for the last 60 to 70 years may be at its highest level in 8,000 years, however they said "that solar variability is unlikely to have been the dominant cause of the strong warming during the past three decades", and concluded that "at the most 30% of the strong warming since [1970] can be of solar origin". Although the paradigm of the Modern Maximum is broadly accepted, its recurrence rate is still an open question., and "solar activity reconstructions tell us that only a minor fraction of the recent global warming can be explained by the variable Sun."

=== Solar activity ===
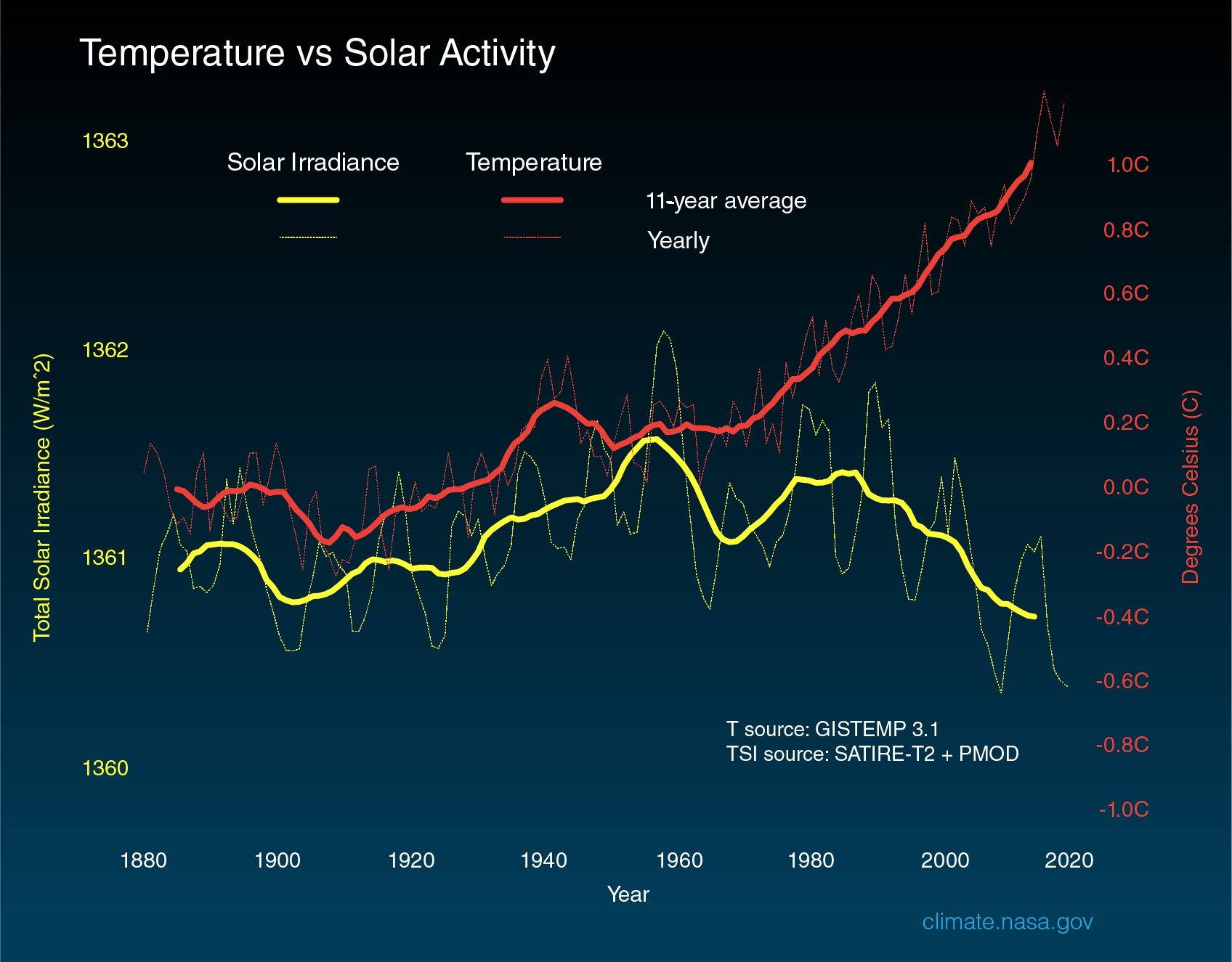
Solar irradiance (yellow) plotted with temperature (red) since 1880.

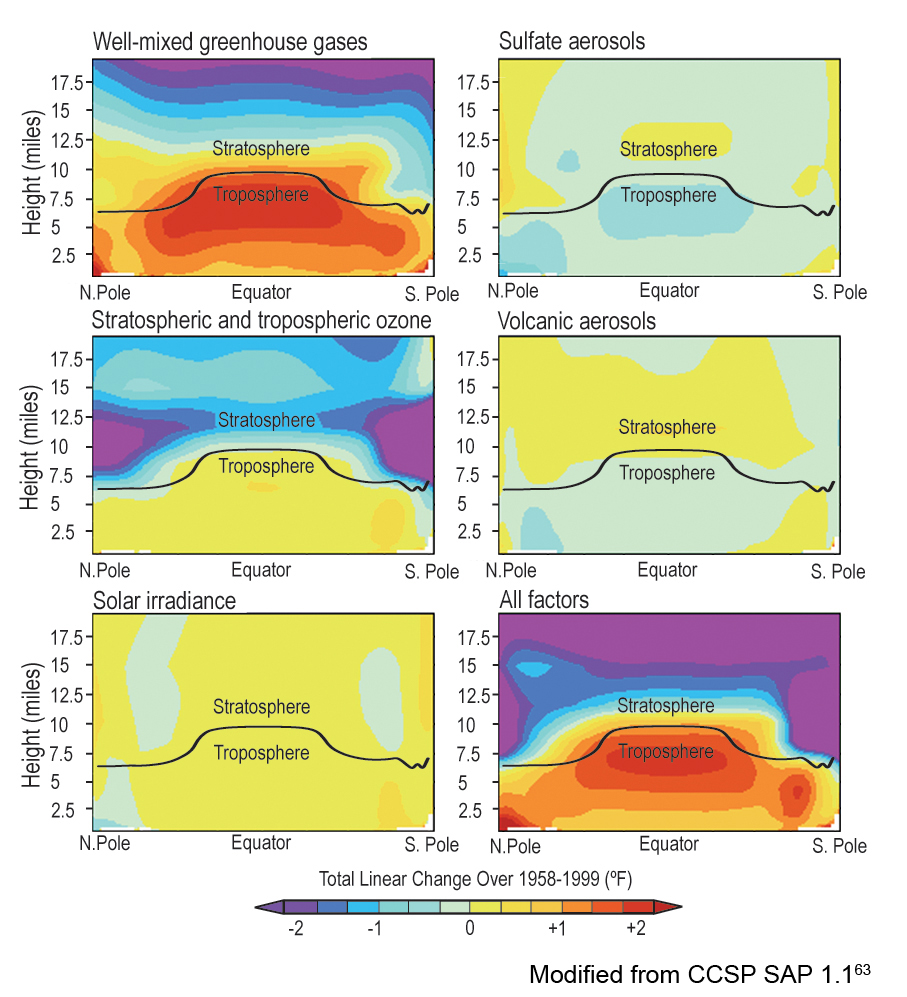
Modeled simulation of the effect of various factors (including GHGs, Solar irradiance) singly and in combination, showing in particular that solar activity produces a small and nearly uniform warming, unlike what is observed.

The role of solar activity in climate change has also been calculated over longer time periods using "proxy" datasets, such as tree rings. Models indicate that solar and volcanic forcings can explain periods of relative warmth and cold between AD 1000 and 1900, but human-induced forcings are needed to reproduce the late-20th century warming.

Another line of evidence against the sun having caused recent climate change comes from looking at how temperatures at different levels in the Earth's atmosphere have changed.

The US Environmental Protection Agency (US EPA, 2009) responded to public comments on climate change attribution. A number of commenters had argued that recent climate change could be attributed to changes in solar irradiance. According to the US EPA (2009), this attribution was not supported by the bulk of the scientific literature. Citing the work of the IPCC (2007), the US EPA pointed to the low contribution of solar irradiance to radiative forcing since the start of the Industrial Revolution in 1750. Over this time period (1750 to 2005), the estimated contribution of solar irradiance to radiative forcing was 5% the value of the combined radiative forcing due to increases in the atmospheric concentrations of carbon dioxide, methane and nitrous oxide (see graph opposite).

The role of the Sun in recent climate change has been looked at by climate scientists. Since 1978, output from the Sun has been measured by satellites significantly more accurately than was previously possible from the surface. These measurements indicate that the Sun's total solar irradiance has not increased since 1978, so the warming during the past 30 years cannot be directly attributed to an increase in total solar energy reaching the Earth (see graph above, left). In the three decades since 1978, the combination of solar and volcanic activity probably had a slight cooling influence on the climate.

Climate models have been used to examine the role of the Sun in recent climate change. Models are unable to reproduce the rapid warming observed in recent decades when they only take into account variations in total solar irradiance and volcanic activity. Models are, however, able to simulate the observed 20th century changes in temperature when they include all of the most important external forcings, including human influences and natural forcings. As has already been stated, Hegerl et al. (2007) concluded that greenhouse gas forcing had "very likely" caused most of the observed global warming since the mid-20th century. In making this conclusion, Hegerl et al. (2007) allowed for the possibility that climate models had been underestimated the effect of solar forcing.

Models and observations (see figure above, middle) show that greenhouse gas results in warming of the lower atmosphere at the surface (called the troposphere) but cooling of the upper atmosphere (called the stratosphere). Depletion of the ozone layer by chemical refrigerants has also resulted in a cooling effect in the stratosphere. If the Sun was responsible for observed warming, warming of the troposphere at the surface and warming at the top of the stratosphere would be expected as increase solar activity would replenish ozone and oxides of nitrogen. The stratosphere has a reverse temperature gradient than the troposphere so as the temperature of the troposphere cools with altitude, the stratosphere rises with altitude. Hadley cells are the mechanism by which equatorial generated ozone in the tropics (highest area of UV irradiance in the stratosphere) is moved poleward. Global climate models suggest that climate change may widen the Hadley cells and push the jetstream northward thereby expanding the tropics region and resulting in warmer, dryer conditions in those areas overall.

==== Comparison with other planets ====
Some have argued that the Sun is responsible for recently observed climate change. Warming on Mars was quoted as evidence that global warming on Earth was being caused by changes in the Sun. This has been discredited by scientists: "Wobbles in the orbit of Mars are the main cause of its climate change in the current era" (see also orbital forcing). Also, there are alternative explanations of why warming had occurred on Triton, Pluto, Jupiter and Mars.

=== Effect of cosmic rays ===
The view that cosmic rays could provide the mechanism by which changes in solar activity affect climate is not supported by the literature. Solomon et al. (2007) state:

[..] the cosmic ray time series does not appear to correspond to global total cloud cover after 1991 or to global low-level cloud cover after 1994. Together with the lack of a proven physical mechanism and the plausibility of other causal factors affecting changes in cloud cover, this makes the association between galactic cosmic ray-induced changes in aerosol and cloud formation controversial

Studies in 2007 and 2008 found no relation between warming in recent decades and cosmic rays. Pierce and Adams (2009) used a model to simulate the effect of cosmic rays on cloud properties. They concluded that the hypothesized effect of cosmic rays was too small to explain recent climate change. The authors of that study noted that their findings did not rule out a possible connection between cosmic rays and climate change, and recommended further research.

Erlykin et al. (2009) found that the evidence showed that connections between solar variation and climate were more likely to be mediated by direct variation of insolation rather than cosmic rays, and concluded: "Hence within our assumptions, the effect of varying solar activity, either by direct solar irradiance or by varying cosmic ray rates, must be less than 0.07 °C since 1956, i.e. less than 14% of the observed global warming." Carslaw (2009) and Pittock (2009) reviewed the recent and historical literature in this field and continue to find that the link between cosmic rays and climate is tenuous, though they encourage continued research.

Henrik Svensmark has suggested that the magnetic activity of the sun deflects cosmic rays, and that this may influence the generation of cloud condensation nuclei, and thereby have an effect on the climate.

== Past estimates of greenhouse gas emissions and temperature rises ==
=== Previous estimates for the year 2020 ===
In 2011, the United Nations Environment Programme looked at how world emissions might develop out to the year 2020 depending on different policy decisions. They convened 55 scientists and experts from 28 scientific groups across 15 countries. Projections, assuming no new efforts to reduce emissions or based on the "business-as-usual" hypothetical trend, suggested global emissions in 2020 of 56 gigatonnes CO_{2}-equivalent (GtCO_{2}-eq), with a range of 55–59 GtCO_{2}-eq. In adopting a different baseline where the pledges to the Copenhagen Accord were met in their most ambitious form, the projected global emission by 2020 will still reach the 50 gigatonnes CO_{2}. Continuing with the current trend, particularly in the case of low-ambition form, there is an expectation of 3° Celsius temperature increase by the end of the century, which is estimated to bring severe environmental, economic, and social consequences.

The report also considered the effect on emissions of policies put forward by UNFCCC Parties to address climate change. Assuming more stringent efforts to limit emissions lead to projected global emissions in 2020 of between 49 and 52 GtCO_{2}-eq, with a median estimate of 51 GtCO_{2}-eq. Assuming less stringent efforts to limit emissions lead to projected global emissions in 2020 of between 53 and 57 GtCO_{2}-eq, with a median estimate of 55 GtCO_{2}-eq.

== See also ==
- Extreme event attribution (Attribution science)
- History of climate change policy and politics
- Historical climatology
- History of geology
- History of geophysics
- Senate Hearing of James E. Hansen (1988)
