= Robert Dixon (clergyman) =

English clergyman, theologian, and royalist

The Reverend Robert Dixon
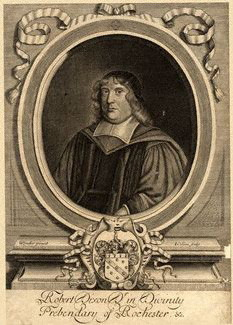
- Born: ca. 1614
- Died: 1688
- Occupation(s): Clergyman and theologian
- Spouse: Sarah Mabb

Robert Dixon (ca. 1614–1688) was an English clergyman, theologian, and royalist.

== Early life ==
Dixon was the son of James Dixon of London and his wife Joane Betson. He was educated at St John's College, Cambridge, where he took his BA in 1634/5 and his MA in 1638, before being ordained in 1639.

== Imprisonment and later career ==
After his ordination, Dixon had obtained a benefice in Kent. A steadfast royalist, he refused to take the Solemn League and Covenant, and as a result was seized after preaching a funeral sermon and imprisoned, first at Knole House and then at Leeds Castle. He was held prisoner at Leeds for fourteen months before being released.

By 1647, Dixon was the rector of Tunstall, a position he held until 1661, though for a time he was sequestered from the position on account of his royalist leanings. After the Restoration, he was appointed one of the prebends of Rochester Cathedral in 1660.

== Works ==
Dixon is known to have authored three books:

- The Doctrine of Faith, Justification, and Assurance humbly endeavoured to be farther cleared towards the satisfaction and comfort of all free unbiassed spirits. With an appendix for Peace, 1668
- The Nature of the two Testaments; or the Disposition of the Will and Estate of God to Mankind for Holiness and Happiness by Jesus Christ, concerning things to be done by Men, and things to be had of God, contained in His two great Testaments of the Law and the Gospel; demon; strating the high spirit and state of the Gospel above the Law, 1670
- The Degrees of Consanguinity and Affinity described and delineatea 1674

He is sometimes held to have written a verse volume called Canidia, or the Witches, of Rhapsody in five parts, by R. D. According to his son James, this work was admired by John Dryden, who met Dixon at Linstead Lodge in Kent and expressed praise for his poetry.

== Family ==
Dixon married Sarah Mabb, daughter of Thomas Mabb of Bersted in Kent. They had three children:

- Robert Dixon, Jr. (d. 1711), who was also rector of Tunstall
- James Dixon (1648–1716), a lawyer
- Elizabeth Dixon (d. 1738), who married another clergyman, Meyrick Head

Through his son James, he was the grandfather of the poet Sarah Dixon.

Dixon died in 1688.
