= Toronto Conference on the Changing Atmosphere =

1988 world climate change conference held in Toronto, Canada

At the Toronto Conference on the Changing Atmosphere: Implications for Global Security, hosted by Canada in Toronto, Ontario, starting on 27 to 30 June 1988, the 300 participants—including policy makers, international scientists, non-governmental and governmental organizations, and United Nations organizations—issued a warning at the conclusion of the conference that humans had unintentionally triggered uncontrolled changes to the atmosphere that if left unchecked could ultimately lead to "consequences could be second only to a global nuclear war." The Toronto Conference took place in the same week that James Hansen, who served as director of NASA's Manhattan-based Goddard Institute for Space Studies (GISS) from 1981 to 2013, had cautioned in his 23 June 1988 testimony before the United States Senate Committee on Energy and Natural Resources, that it was 99% certain that the global "warming trend was not a natural variation" but was the result of by a "buildup" of CO_{2} and other "artificial gases in the atmosphere." The Conference "launched" discussions of potential international action and public policy responses to climate change which included early targets for CO_{2} emission reductions.

== Overview ==
Then Prime Minister of Canada, Brian Mulroney gave the opening address and Tom McMillan, then Minister of the Environment, gave the closing address. Gro Harlem Brundtland, who had served from 1983 to 1987 as chair of the World Commission on Environment and Development, established by the United Nations, presented the key note address on Our Common Future, also known as the Brundtland Report, —a 300-page 1987 Brundtland Report report by the commission, entitled "Our Common Future". (Note: The Brundtland Commission investigated overlapping issues such as the environment and sustainable development of energy, industry, agriculture, forestry, and human settlements. They also investigated overlaps with population and food security, international economic relations, decision support systems for environmental management, and international cooperation. The Commission held 100s of public hearings and received more than 800 written submissions. See p. 296-7 Initial funding came from the government of Canada as well as the governments of "Denmark, Finland, Japan, the Netherlands, Norway, Sweden, and Switzerland." In the reports call for action, it stated that "Over the course of 20th century, the "relationship between the human world and the planet that sustains it has undergone a profound change...[By the 1980s], "vastly increased human numbers and their activities have that power" and "major, unintended changes are occurring in the atmosphere, in soils, in waters, among plants and animals, and in the relationships among all of these. The rate of change is outstripping the ability of scientific disciplines and our current capabilities to assess and advise. It is frustrating the attempts of political and economic institutions, which evolved in a different, more fragmented world, to adapt and cope." See p. 281) (Note: The World Commission on Environment and Development— a special independent committee—was established in December 1983 by the Secretary-General of the United Nations to "formulate" "a global agenda for change" with Gro Harlem Brundtland of Norway as chair.")

The conference included special addresses, key note and luncheon speeches, and deliberations. Various conference documents and reports were produced including the "final statement, working group reports, a background document by J. Jaeger and a statement prepared by the non-governmental organizations."

Topics discussed included climate change, greenhouses, ozone, air pollutants, global warming, sustainable development, pollution, and water resources. (Note: The World Meteorological Organization includes the archives of the proceedings of the World Conference on Changing Atmosphere including the "invited presentations to the Conference and the results of its deliberations. The document is organized into four sections. The first presents the special addresses provided by the keynote and luncheon speakers. That is followed by all the theme papers. The third part includes the various conference documents and reports which emerged, including the final statement, working group reports, a background document by J. Jaeger and a statement prepared by the non-governmental organizations. The final section consists of a series of appendices presenting other documents pertinent to the Conference, as well as a list of participants and of conference committees and their members." See WMO UNEP)

The 1988 Toronto Conference took place in the same week that James E. Hansen director of NASA's Manhattan-based Goddard Institute for Space Studies cautioned in his 23 June 1988 testimony before the United States Senate Committee on Energy and Natural Resources that it was 99% certain that the global "warming trend was not a natural variation but was caused by a buildup of carbon dioxide and other artificial gases in the atmosphere." From 27 to 30 June, ...a "World Conference on the Changing Atmosphere: Implications for Global Security" gathered hundreds of scientists and others in Toronto. They concluded that the changes in the atmosphere due to human pollution "represent a major threat to international security and are already having harmful consequences over many parts of the globe," and declared that by 2005 the world would be well-advised to push its emissions some 20% below the 1988 level.

Starting on 30 June 1988, Stephen Lewis chaired the international Toronto Conference on the Changing Atmosphere with 300 scientists from around the world in attendance. The "first global scientific consensus" that the world was "entering an era of unprecedented climate change" emerged from that meeting.

The Conference took place against the backdrop of a heat wave that set new records in Toronto. Temperatures soared to "levels never recorded before in over 150 years of observation." Participants included then Prime Minister of Canada, Brian Mulroney. Participants discussed "emerging concerns about global atmospheric issues including acid rain, stratospheric ozone depletion and global warming." The 1988 conference, "proposed a specific initial target for a global reduction in the emission of carbon dioxide – 20% below 1988 levels by 2005."The international media, which was not used to consensus on environmental issues, noted the "high level of scientific consensus" on global warming.

Conference participants suggested that climate change was almost as serious as nuclear war and early targets for CO_{2} emission reductions were discussed.

== Responses to the Toronto Conference ==
The 1988 Toronto Conference was the inspiration for the 1989 Canadian Broadcasting Corporation radio series, It's a Matter of Survival, and Anita Gordon and David Suzuki's 1990 non-fiction book by the same name describing the next half century in terms of the environment.

A symposium was held on 28 June 2013, at the University of Toronto in Scarborough marking the 25th anniversary of the Toronto Conference.

== See also ==
- History of climate change policy and politics
- History of climate change science
- Brundtland Report
- Senate Hearing of James E. Hansen (1988)
