= Reid Bryson =

American scientist (1920–2008)

- Born: June 7, 1920; Detroit, Michigan, US
- Died: June 11, 2008 (aged 88); Madison, Wisconsin, US

Academic background
- Education: Denison University; University of Chicago

Academic work
- Discipline: atmospheric science geology meteorology
- Institutions: University of Wisconsin–Madison
- Notable works: Climates of Hunger

Reid Bryson (June 7, 1920 – June 11, 2008) was an American atmospheric scientist, geologist and meteorologist. He was a professor emeritus of the University of Wisconsin–Madison. He completed a B.A. in geology at Denison University in 1941 and a Ph.D. in meteorology from the University of Chicago in 1948. In 1946 he joined the faculty of the University of Wisconsin–Madison, and in 1948 he became the founder and first chairman of the University of Wisconsin-Madison's Department of Meteorology and Center for Climatic Research. He was the first director of the Institute for Environmental Studies (now the Nelson Institute) in 1970.

In 1944, during World War II, he was one of the few meteorologists who accurately identified Typhoon Cobra, which savaged Halsey's Third Fleet.

Bryson was made a Global Laureate by the United Nations Global Environment Program in 1990.

== Views ==
Bryson's main contribution to the debate on climate change was the idea of "the human volcano" causing global cooling, via an increase in aerosol loading. This idea was sparked in 1962 by his own observation, while flying across India en route to a conference, that his view of the ground was blocked not by clouds but by dust. At the time, the instrumental temperature record did not show unambiguous warming and the view that the earth might be cooling, and heading for further cooling, was not unreasonable. Others, including Hubert Lamb, who created a Dust Veil Index, thought volcanoes were more responsible for global-scale aerosol.

In 1973, Bryson testified to Congress that global warming from fossil-fuel combustion was politically unstoppable.

There is no way right now that we can control the climate to make it more benign. Even if we were to say "let us stop using fossil fuels so that we do not add carbon dioxide to the atmosphere, because that impacts the world climate," how on earth could you stop using fossil fuels? Even those countries that are most heavily impacted by the climatic change are the ones who say it is our turn to be affluent and it is in the use of fossil fuels that one gains affluence.

In later years, when it was clear that the climate was indeed warming, Bryson argued that while climate change and a global increase in temperature are real, he did not believe that they are caused by human activity. Rather, he argued that they are part of natural global climate cycles, particularly the end of the Little Ice Age:

"All this argument is the temperature going up or not, it’s absurd," Bryson continues. "Of course it’s going up. It has gone up since the early 1800s, before the Industrial Revolution, because we’re coming out of the Little Ice Age, not because we’re putting more carbon dioxide into the air."

== Selected publications ==
Bryson wrote more than 230 articles and five books, including Climates of Hunger, which won the Banta Medal for Literary Achievement.

=== Books ===
- R. A. Bryson, Airmasses, Streamlines, and the Boreal Forest 1966: Department of Mines and Technical Surveys, Geography Branch
- Bryson, R.A.; Hare, F.K. (1974). Climates of North America. World Survey of Climatology. Vol. 11. Elsevier. ISBN 9780444410627. OCLC 853026734.
- Bryson, Reid A.; Murray, Thomas J. (1977). Climates of Hunger: Mankind and the World's Changing Weather. University of Wisconsin Press. ISBN 978-0-299-07373-2.

=== Selected articles ===
- Bryson, R. A. (1966). "Air masses, streamlines, and the boreal forest". Geography Bulletin. 8: 228–269.
- Bryson, R. A. (May 17, 1974). "A Perspective on Climatic Change". Science. 184 (4138): 753–760. Bibcode:1974Sci...184..753B. doi:10.1126/science.184.4138.753. PMID 17783463.
- Bryson, R. A.; Goodman, B. M. (March 7, 1980). "Volcanic Activity and Climatic Changes". Science. 207 (4435): 1041–4. Bibcode:1980Sci...207.1041B. doi:10.1126/science.207.4435.1041. PMID 17759813. S2CID 26336581.
