= Robert E. Dickinson =

American meteorologist and geoscientist (1940–2026)

- Born: Robert Earl Dickinson; March 26, 1940; Millersburg, Ohio, U.S.
- Died: September 11, 2026 (aged 86)
- Education: Harvard University; Massachusetts Institute of Technology School of Science
- Scientific career
- Fields: Climate science and meteorology
- Workplaces: University of Arizona; Georgia Tech; University of Texas at Austin

Robert Earl Dickinson (March 26, 1940 – September 11, 2026) was an American meteorologist and geoscientist.

== Life and career ==
Robert Earl Dickinson was born in Millersburg, Ohio, on March 26, 1940. He studied chemistry and physics at Harvard University, and graduated with a bachelor's degree in 1961. As a graduate student, he studied meteorology at Massachusetts Institute of Technology (MIT), completing a master's degree in 1962 and Ph.D. in 1966. After MIT, he joined the National Center for Atmospheric Research (NCAR) in Boulder, Colorado in 1968. There, he co-created the Roble–Dickinson–Ridley model, the first three-dimensional general circulation model of the thermosphere. In 1975 he was appointed head of the climate division, and in 1981 became deputy director of the climate and global dynamics division. In 1990 Dickinson was appointed professor at the University of Arizona; in 1999 he moved to Georgia Institute of Technology, and was later a professor in the Jackson School of Geosciences at the University of Texas at Austin from 2008, until his retirement in 2018.

He worked on climate models and computer models of processes in the atmosphere including interactions with the biosphere, global climate change, the carbon cycle on land, remote sensing, and the disappearance of tropical rain forests.

In 1996, he received the Vetlesen Prize and the Revelle Medal from the American Geophysical Union (AGU) and in 1997 the Rossby Award from the American Meteorological Society (AMS). He was a member of the National Academy of Sciences (NAS) (1988) and the American Association for the Advancement of Science (AAAS). In 2002, he was elected a member of the National Academy of Engineering for pioneering contributions to a wide range of topics in atmospheric dynamics and earth system modeling.

In 2006, he became a foreign member of the Chinese Academy of Sciences. From 2002 to 2004, he was president of the AGU He was a Fellow of the AMS, whose Clarence Leroy Meisinger Award he received in 1973. He was an honorary member of the European Geophysical Society (EGS) and the European Geosciences Union (EGU).

Dickinson died on September 11, 2026, at the age of 86.
