= Keeling (disambiguation) =

The Keeling Curve is a graph that shows the steady rise of atmospheric carbon dioxide throughout the twentieth century. It is named after Charles David Keeling, who identified the increase in carbon dioxide levels and plotted the graph.

A Keeling Plot is a graphical representation of variations in δ^{13}C (carbon isotope ratios) (y-axis), plotted against the inverse of CO_{2} concentration (1/[CO_{2}]) (x-axis), used to identify sources and sinks of carbon within ecosystems.

Keeling may also refer to:

== Places ==
- Keeling, Virginia, United States; an unincorporated community
- North Keeling, Cocos Islands, Australia; a coral atoll
- Cocos (Keeling) Islands, Australia; an Australian external territory

== People ==
Surname

- Charles Keeling (1928–2005), American climatologist
- Clinton Keeling (1932–2007), British zoologist and author
- David Keeling (born 1951), Australian artist
- Edward Keeling (1883–1954), British politician
- Elsa d'Esterre-Keeling, pen-name of Elizabeth Henrietta Keeling (1857–1935), Irish novelist and translator
- Grace Keeling (born 1999), English influencer and presenter known as GK Barry
- Harold Keeling (born 1963) basketball player
- Jayson Keeling (born 1966), American artist
- John Keeling (politician) (1586–1649), English MP
- Ralph Keeling (born 1959), American climatologist
- Ray Keeling (1915–1996), American football player
- Stanley Victor Keeling (1894–1979), British philosopher
- William Keeling (1577–1619), English sea captain

== Other uses ==
- USS Keeling (codenamed Greyhound), a fictional Mahan-class destroyer created by C.S. Forester for the 1955 World War II novel The Good Shepherd (novel), and also found in the 2020 film adaptation Greyhound (film).

== See also ==
- Keel (disambiguation)
