= Lisa Welp =

American biogeochemist

- Born: United States
- Education: Ph.D California Institute of Technology
- Scientific career
- Fields: Biogeochemistry
- Workplaces: Purdue University (2015-Present) Assistant Project Scientist, Scripps Institution of Oceanography (2012-2014) Postdoctoral Scholar, Scripps Institution of Oceanography (2008-2012) Postdoctoral Research Associate & Lecturer, Yale University (2006-2008)

Lisa Welp is a biogeochemist who utilizes stable isotopes to understand how water and carbon dioxide are exchanged between the land and atmosphere. She is a professor at Purdue University in the department of Earth, Atmosphere, and Planetary Sciences.

== Early life and education ==
Lisa Welp grew up in Ferdinand, Indiana. In high school, Welp participated in a program from Indiana University titled Exploration of Careers in Science where she spent eight weeks on campus doing research for the university. She focuses her research on isotopes of oxygen-18 of CO_{2} and water, and she did field work in Alaska and Siberia studying the carbon cycling in the forests. Welp attained her Master of Science from the California Institute of Technology in Pasadena California in Environmental Science and Engineering in 2002. She also received her PhD from California Institute of Technology in the same field in 2006. Dr. Welp's obtained her undergraduate degree in chemistry (minor in geology) in 2000 from Indiana University in Bloomington, Indiana.

== Career and research ==
Welp is currently an assistant professor at Purdue University in Earth, Atmosphere, and Planetary Sciences. Prior to this, she was an Assistant Project Scientist (2012–2014) and Postdoctoral Scholar (2008–2012) at the Scripps Institution of Oceanography, UCSD and postdoctoral Research Associate & Lecturer at Yale University (2006–2008).

Welp's areas of research concern stable isotope biogeochemistry, water and carbon dioxide exchange from land biosphere and the atmosphere, and boreal forest carbon cycling. In 2008, she worked with the Keeling CO_{2} Lab run by Ralph Keeling, son of Charles David Keeling (see also Keeling Curve). Her work at Scripps led to greater understanding of how ENSO (El Nino Southern Oscillation) affects global shifts in primary production, due to the redistribution of moisture. Welp quantified this using δ^{18}O-CO_{2} (the isotopic shift in precipitation is transferred to respired CO_{2}). Her analysis suggested that global estimates of gross primary production (GPP) were too low and revised them upwards to 150–170 petagrams (1.5×10^{11}–1.7×10^{11} t) carbon per year.

Welp's collaborative research program has provided insight into how seasonal warming and drying affects ecosystem exchange of carbon in boreal forests, how seasonal exchange of C between the atmosphere and biosphere has shifted over time, potentially due to increased water use efficiency, proportional to the rise in atmospheric CO_{2}

== Awards and fellowships ==
- Great Lakes Chief Scientist Training Cruise Award
- BASIN young investigator travel grant 2011
- Outstanding poster contribution at the International Carbon Dioxide Conference 2009
- EPA Science to Achieve Results (STAR) Fellowship: 2001-2004
- BASIN student travel grants: 2002-2004
