= C/2017 T1 (Heinze) =

Parabolic comet

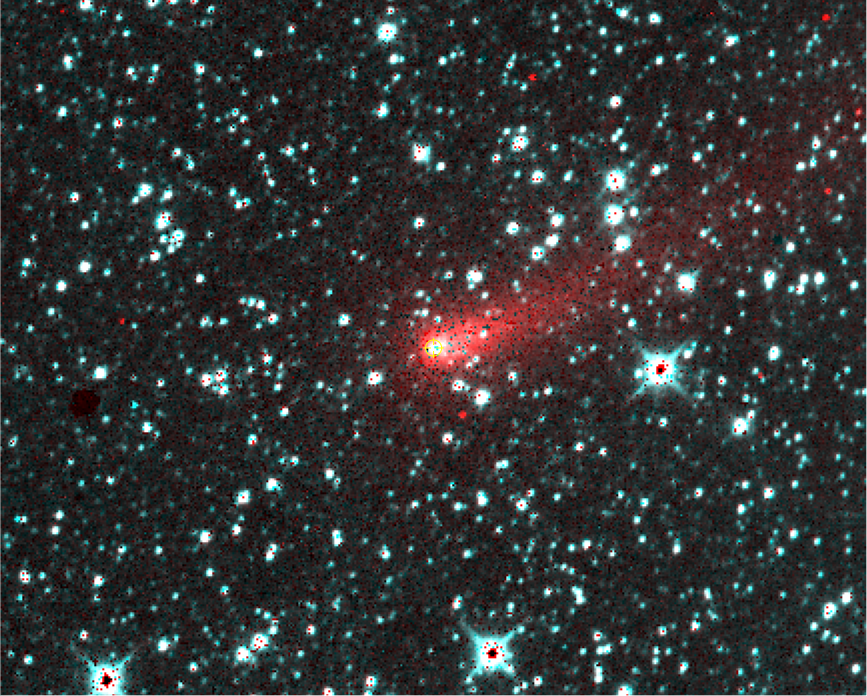
- Infrared image of Comet Heinze taken by NEOWISE on 9 January 2018

Discovery
- Discovered by: Aren N. Heinze
- Discovery site: ATLAS–MLO (T08)
- Discovery date: 2 October 2017

Designations
- Alternative designations: CK17T010

Orbital characteristics
- Epoch: 14 December 2017 (JD 2458101.5)
- Observation arc: 262 days
- Earliest precovery date: 28 September 2017
- Number of observations: 1,005
- Perihelion: 0.581 AU
- Eccentricity: 1.00034
- Inclination: 96.83°
- Longitude of ascending node: 102.32°
- Argument of periapsis: 96.92°
- Last perihelion: 21 February 2018
- Earth MOID: 0.014 AU
- Jupiter MOID: 3.032 AU

Physical characteristics
- Mean radius: 3.22 km (2.00 mi)
- Comet total magnitude (M1): 11.9
- Comet nuclear magnitude (M2): 17.0
- Apparent magnitude: 8.2 (2017 apparition)

C/2017 T1 (Heinze) is a non-periodic comet that passed closest to Earth on 4 January 2018 at a distance of 0.22 AU (33 million km).

== Discovery and observations ==
It was discovered on 2 October 2017 by Aren N. Heinze of the University of Hawaiʻi, using the 0.5-m Schmidt telescope at the Mauna Loa Observatory used for the Asteroid Terrestrial-impact Last Alert System (ATLAS). Perihelion was reached on 21 February 2018, and it was expected peak magnitude about 8.8. However, this intrinsically faint comet began to disintegrate around this time. It was last observed as a dim 16th-magnitude object on 23 April 2018.

== Observation path ==
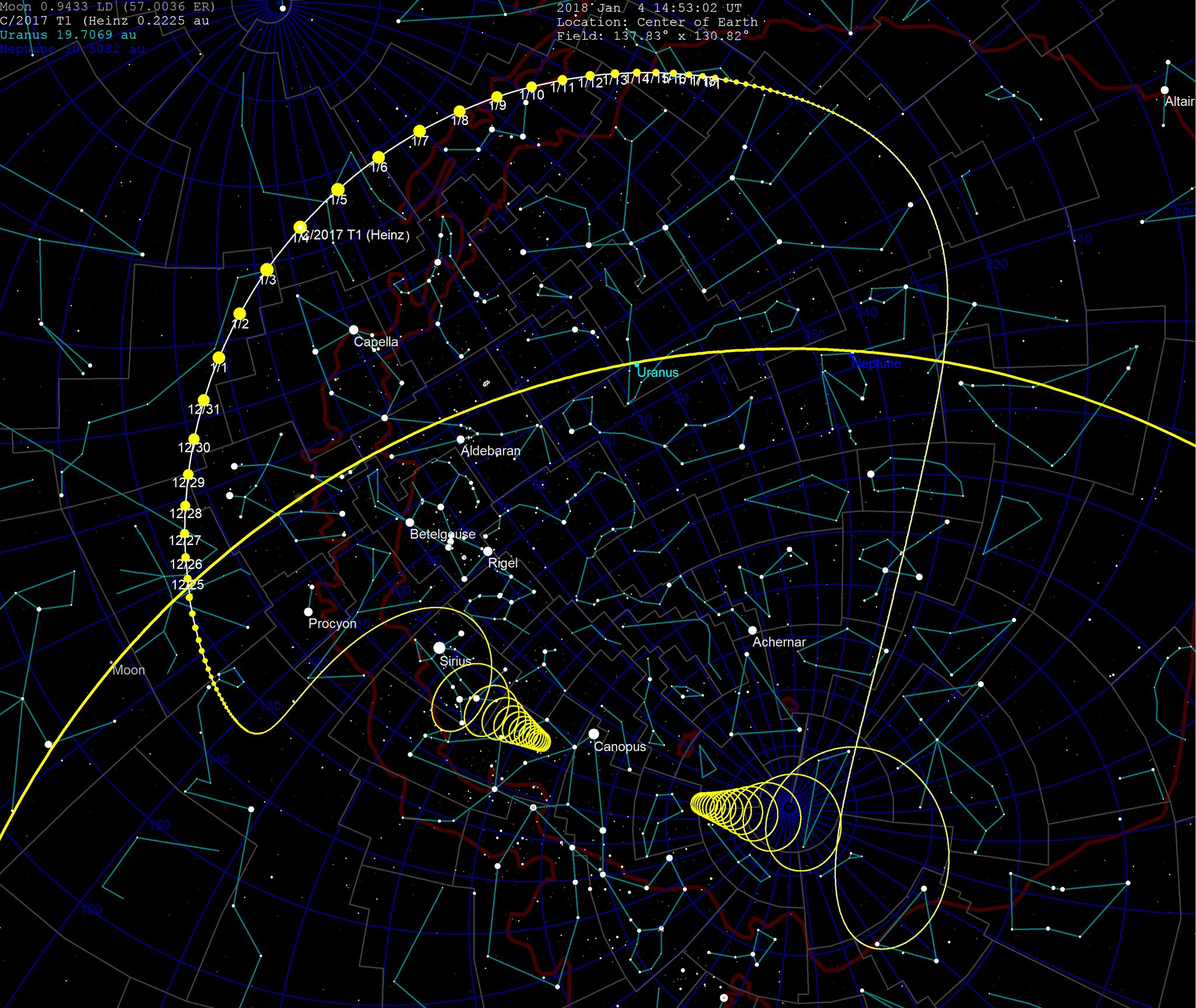
Path of C/2017 T1 (Heinze) in sky. It is closest to Earth on Jan 4, 2018 and passed over the north pole as it approaches perihelion.
