= Carbon dioxide in the atmosphere of Earth =

Atmospheric constituent and greenhouse gas

Atmospheric CO_{2} concentration measured at Mauna Loa Observatory in Hawaii from 1958 to 2023 (also called the Keeling Curve). The rise in CO_{2} over that time period is clearly visible. The concentration is expressed as μmole per mole, or ppm.

In the atmosphere of Earth, carbon dioxide (CO_{2}) is a trace gas that plays an integral part in the greenhouse effect, carbon cycle, photosynthesis, and oceanic carbon cycle. It is one of three main greenhouse gases in the atmosphere of Earth. In 2026, the concentration of carbon dioxide in the atmosphere reached 432 ppm or 0.0432% (on a molar basis), representing a mass of 3380 gigatonnes. This is an increase of 54% since the start of the Industrial Revolution, up from 280 ppm during the 10,000 years prior to the mid-18th century. The increase is due to human activity.

The current increase in CO_{2} concentrations is primarily driven by the burning of fossil fuels. Other significant human activities that emit CO_{2} include cement production, deforestation, and biomass burning. The increase in atmospheric concentrations of CO_{2} and other long-lived greenhouse gases such as methane increase the absorption and emission of infrared radiation by the atmosphere. This has led to a rise in average global temperature and ocean acidification. Another direct effect is the CO_{2} fertilization effect. The increase in atmospheric concentrations of CO_{2} causes a range of further effects of climate change on the environment and human living conditions.

Carbon dioxide is a greenhouse gas. It absorbs and emits infrared radiation at its two infrared-active vibrational frequencies. The two wavelengths are 4.26 μm (2,347 cm^{−1}) (antisymmetric stretching vibrational mode) and 14.99 μm (667 cm^{−1}) (bending vibrational mode). CO_{2} plays a significant role in influencing Earth's surface temperature through the greenhouse effect. Light emission from the Earth's surface is most intense in the infrared region between 200 and 2500 cm^{−1}, as opposed to light emission from the much hotter Sun which is most intense in the visible region. Absorption of infrared light at the vibrational frequencies of atmospheric CO_{2} traps energy near the surface, warming the surface of Earth and its lower atmosphere. Less energy reaches the upper atmosphere, which is therefore cooler because of this absorption.

The present atmospheric concentration of CO_{2} is the highest for 14 million years. Concentrations of CO_{2} in the atmosphere were as high as 4,000 ppm during the Cambrian period about 500 million years ago, and as low as 180 ppm during the Quaternary glaciation of the last two million years. Reconstructed temperature records for the last 420 million years indicate that atmospheric CO_{2} concentrations peaked at approximately 2,000 ppm. This peak happened during the Devonian period (400 million years ago). Another peak occurred in the Triassic period (220–200 million years ago).

== Current concentration and future trends ==
Between 1850 and 2019 the Global Carbon Project estimates that about 2/3rds of excess carbon dioxide emissions have been caused by burning fossil fuels, and a little less than half of that has stayed in the atmosphere.

=== Current situation ===
Since the start of the Industrial Revolution, atmospheric CO_{2} concentration has been increasing, causing global warming and ocean acidification. In October 2023 the average level of CO_{2} in Earth's atmosphere, adjusted for seasonal variation, was 422.17 parts per million by volume (ppm). Figures are published monthly by the National Oceanic & Atmospheric Administration (NOAA). The value had been about 280 ppm during the 10,000 years up to the mid-18th century.

Each part per million of CO_{2} in the atmosphere represents approximately 2.13 gigatonnes of carbon, or 7.82 gigatonnes of CO_{2}.

It was pointed out in 2021 that "the current rates of increase of the concentration of the major greenhouse gases (carbon dioxide, methane and nitrous oxide) are unprecedented over at least the last 800,000 years".

As of 2024, it is estimated that 2,650 gigatonnes of CO_{2} have been emitted by human activity since 1850, with annual emissions of 42 gigatonnes per year. About 1,050 gigatonnes remain in the atmosphere following absorption by oceans and land.

Some fraction (a projected 20–35%) of the fossil carbon transferred thus far will persist in the atmosphere as elevated CO_{2} levels for many thousands of years after these carbon transfer activities begin to subside.

=== Annual and regional fluctuations ===
Atmospheric CO_{2} concentrations fluctuate slightly with the seasons, falling during the Northern Hemisphere spring and summer as plants consume the gas and rising during northern autumn and winter as plants go dormant or die and decay. The level drops by about 6 or 7 ppm (about 50 Gt) from May to September during the Northern Hemisphere's growing season, and then goes up by about 8 or 9 ppm. The Northern Hemisphere dominates the annual cycle of CO_{2} concentration because it has much greater land area and plant biomass in mid-latitudes (30-60 degrees) than the Southern Hemisphere. Concentrations reach a peak in May as the Northern Hemisphere spring greenup begins, and decline to a minimum in October, near the end of the growing season.

Concentrations also vary on a regional basis, most strongly near the ground with much smaller variations aloft. In urban areas concentrations are generally higher and indoors they can reach 10 times background levels.

=== Measurements and predictions made in the recent past ===
The concentration of atmospheric carbon dioxide has been increasing in progressively greater amounts.

- Data from 2009 found that the global mean CO_{2} concentration was rising at a rate of approximately 2 ppm/year and accelerating.
- The daily average concentration of atmospheric CO_{2} at Mauna Loa Observatory first exceeded 400 ppm on 10 May 2013 although this concentration had already been reached in the Arctic in June 2012. Data from 2013 showed that the concentration of carbon dioxide in the atmosphere is this high "for the first time in 55 years of measurement—and probably more than 3 million years of Earth history."
- As of 2018, CO_{2} concentrations were measured to be 410 ppm.

== Measurement techniques ==
Carbon dioxide observations from 2008 to 2017 showing the seasonal variations and the difference between northern and southern hemispheres

The concentrations of carbon dioxide in the atmosphere are expressed as parts per million by volume (abbreviated as ppmv, or ppm(v), or just ppm). To convert from the usual ppmv units to ppm mass (abbreviated as ppmm, or ppm(m)), multiply by the ratio of the molar mass of CO_{2} to that of air, i.e. times 1.52 (44.01 divided by 28.96).

The first reproducibly accurate measurements of atmospheric CO_{2} were from flask sample measurements made by Dave Keeling at Caltech in the 1950s. Measurements at Mauna Loa have been ongoing since 1958. Additionally, measurements are also made at many other sites around the world. Many measurement sites are part of larger global networks. Global network data are often made publicly available.

=== Data networks ===
There are several surface measurement (including flasks and continuous in situ) networks including NOAA/ERSL, WDCGG, and RAMCES. The NOAA/ESRL Baseline Observatory Network, and the Scripps Institution of Oceanography Network data are hosted at the CDIAC at ORNL. The World Data Centre for Greenhouse Gases (WDCGG), part of GAW, data are hosted by the JMA. The Reseau Atmospherique de Mesure des Composes an Effet de Serre database (RAMCES) is part of IPSL.

From these measurements, further products are made which integrate data from the various sources. These products also address issues such as data discontinuity and sparseness. GLOBALVIEW-CO_{2} is one of these products.

=== Analytical methods to investigate sources of CO_{2} ===
- The burning of long-buried fossil fuels releases CO_{2} containing carbon of different isotopic ratios to those of living plants, enabling distinction between natural and human-caused contributions to CO_{2} concentration.
- There are higher atmospheric CO_{2} concentrations in the Northern Hemisphere, where most of the world's population lives (and emissions originate from), compared to the southern hemisphere. This difference has increased as anthropogenic emissions have increased.
- Atmospheric O_{2} levels are decreasing in Earth's atmosphere as it reacts with the carbon in fossil fuels to form CO_{2}.

== Causes of the current increase ==
=== Anthropogenic CO_{2} emissions ===
The US, China and Russia have cumulatively contributed the greatest amounts of CO_{2} since 1850.

While CO_{2} absorption and release is always happening as a result of natural processes, the recent rise in CO_{2} levels in the atmosphere is known to be mainly due to human (anthropogenic) activity. Anthropogenic carbon emissions exceed the amount that can be taken up or balanced out by natural sinks. Thus carbon dioxide has gradually accumulated in the atmosphere and, as of May 2022, its concentration is 50% above pre-industrial levels.

The extraction and burning of fossil fuels, releasing carbon that has been underground for many millions of years, has increased the atmospheric concentration of CO_{2}. As of year 2019 the extraction and burning of geologic fossil carbon by humans releases over 30 gigatonnes of CO_{2} (9 billion tonnes carbon) each year. This larger disruption to the natural balance is responsible for recent growth in the atmospheric CO_{2} concentration. Currently about half of the carbon dioxide released from the burning of fossil fuels is not absorbed by vegetation and the oceans and remains in the atmosphere.

Burning fossil fuels such as coal, petroleum, and natural gas is the leading cause of increased anthropogenic CO_{2}; deforestation is the second major cause. In 2010, 9.14 gigatonnes of carbon (GtC, equivalent to 33.5 gigatonnes of CO_{2} or about 4.3 ppm in Earth's atmosphere) were released from fossil fuels and cement production worldwide, compared to 6.15 GtC in 1990. In addition, land use change contributed 0.87 GtC in 2010, compared to 1.45 GtC in 1990. In the period 1751 to 1900, about 12 GtC were released as CO_{2} to the atmosphere from burning of fossil fuels, whereas from 1901 to 2013 the figure was about 380 GtC.

The International Energy Agency estimates that the top 1% of emitters globally each had carbon footprints of over 50 tonnes of CO_{2} in 2021, more than 1,000 times greater than those of the bottom 1% of emitters. The global average energy-related carbon footprint is around 4.7 tonnes of CO_{2} per person.

== Roles in natural processes on Earth ==
=== Greenhouse effect ===
Greenhouse gases allow sunlight to pass through the atmosphere, heating the planet, but then absorb and redirect the infrared radiation (heat) the planet emits.

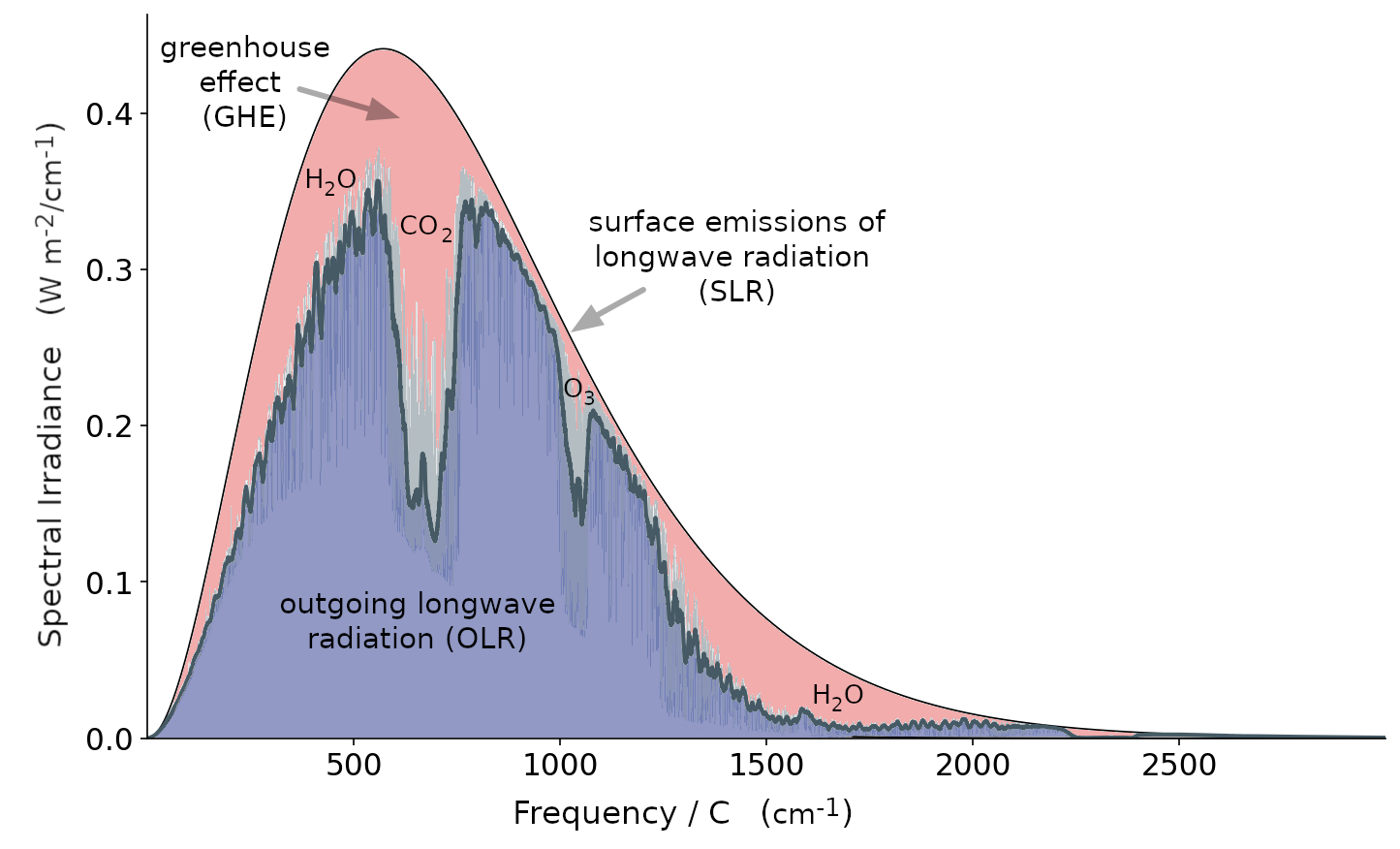
CO_{2} reduces the flux of thermal radiation emitted to space (causing the large dip near 667 cm^{−1}), thereby contributing to the greenhouse effect.

Longwave-infrared absorption coefficients of water vapor and carbon dioxide. For wavelengths near 15-microns, CO_{2} is a much stronger absorber than water vapor.

On Earth, carbon dioxide is the most relevant, direct greenhouse gas that is influenced by human activities. Water is responsible for most (about 36–70%) of the total greenhouse effect, and the role of water vapor as a greenhouse gas depends on temperature. Carbon dioxide is often mentioned in the context of its increased influence as a greenhouse gas since the pre-industrial (1750) era. In 2013, the increase in CO_{2} was estimated to be responsible for 1.82 W m^{−2} of the 2.63 W m^{−2} change in radiative forcing on Earth (about 70%).

Earth's natural greenhouse effect makes life as we know it possible, and carbon dioxide in the atmosphere plays a significant role in providing for the relatively high temperature on Earth. The greenhouse effect is a process by which thermal radiation from a planetary atmosphere warms the planet's surface beyond the temperature it would have in the absence of its atmosphere.

The concept of more atmospheric CO_{2} increasing ground temperature was first published by Svante Arrhenius in 1896. The increased radiative forcing due to increased CO_{2} in the Earth's atmosphere is based on the physical properties of CO_{2} and the non-saturated absorption windows where CO_{2} absorbs outgoing long-wave energy. The increased forcing drives further changes in Earth's energy balance and, over the longer term, in Earth's climate.

=== Carbon cycle ===
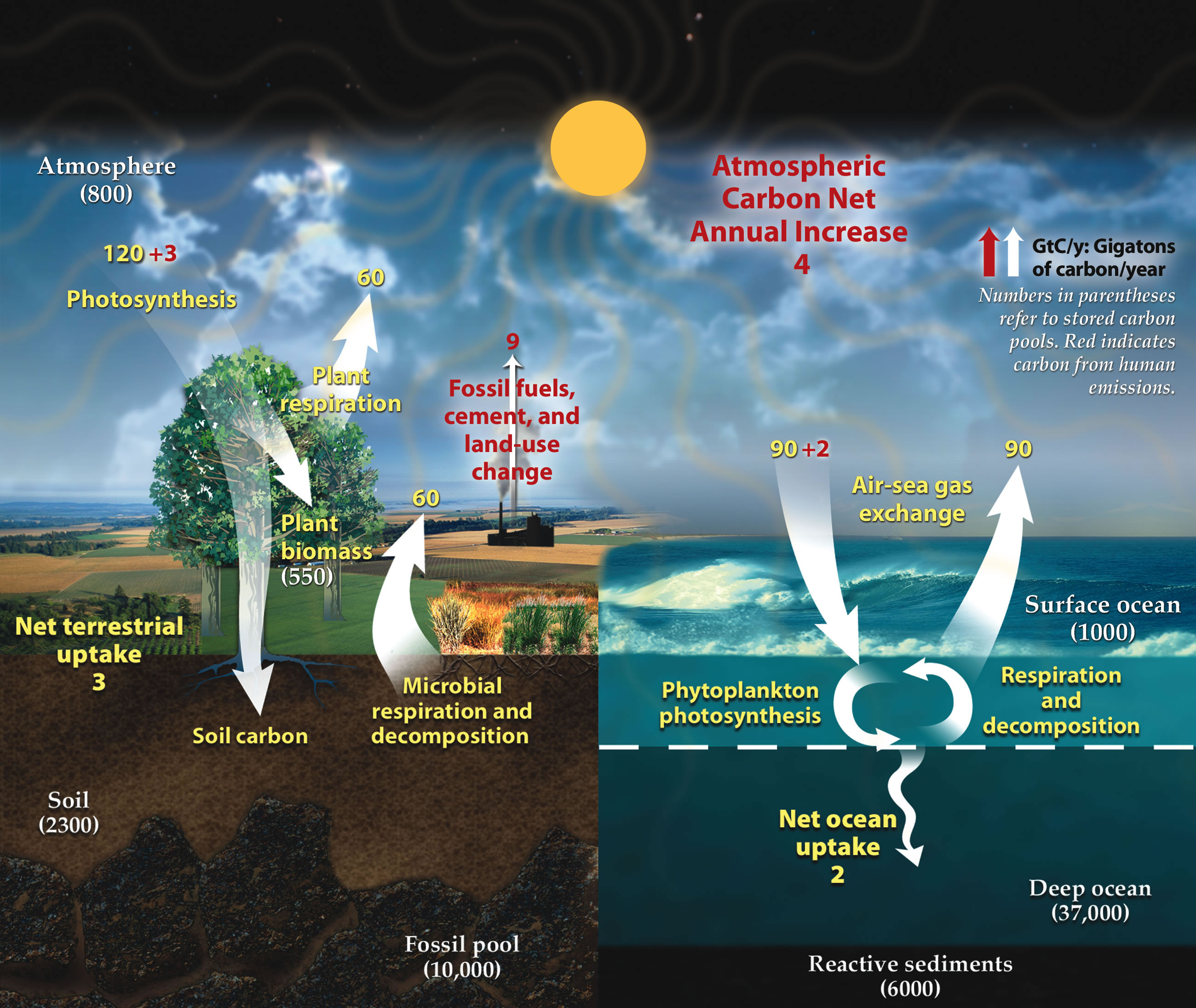
This diagram of the carbon cycle shows the movement of carbon between land, atmosphere, and oceans in billions of metric tons of carbon per year. Yellow numbers are natural fluxes, red are human contributions, white are stored carbon.

Atmospheric carbon dioxide plays an integral role in the Earth's carbon cycle whereby CO_{2} is removed from the atmosphere by some natural processes such as photosynthesis and deposition of carbonates, to form limestones for example, and added back to the atmosphere by other natural processes such as respiration and the acid dissolution of carbonate deposits. There are two broad carbon cycles on Earth: the fast carbon cycle and the slow carbon cycle. The fast carbon cycle refers to movements of carbon between the environment and living things in the biosphere whereas the slow carbon cycle involves the movement of carbon between the atmosphere, oceans, soil, rocks, and volcanism. Both cycles are intrinsically interconnected and atmospheric CO_{2} facilitates the linkage.

Natural sources of atmospheric CO_{2} include volcanic outgassing, the combustion of organic matter, wildfires and the respiration processes of living aerobic organisms. Man-made sources of CO_{2} include the burning of fossil fuels, as well as some industrial processes such as cement making.

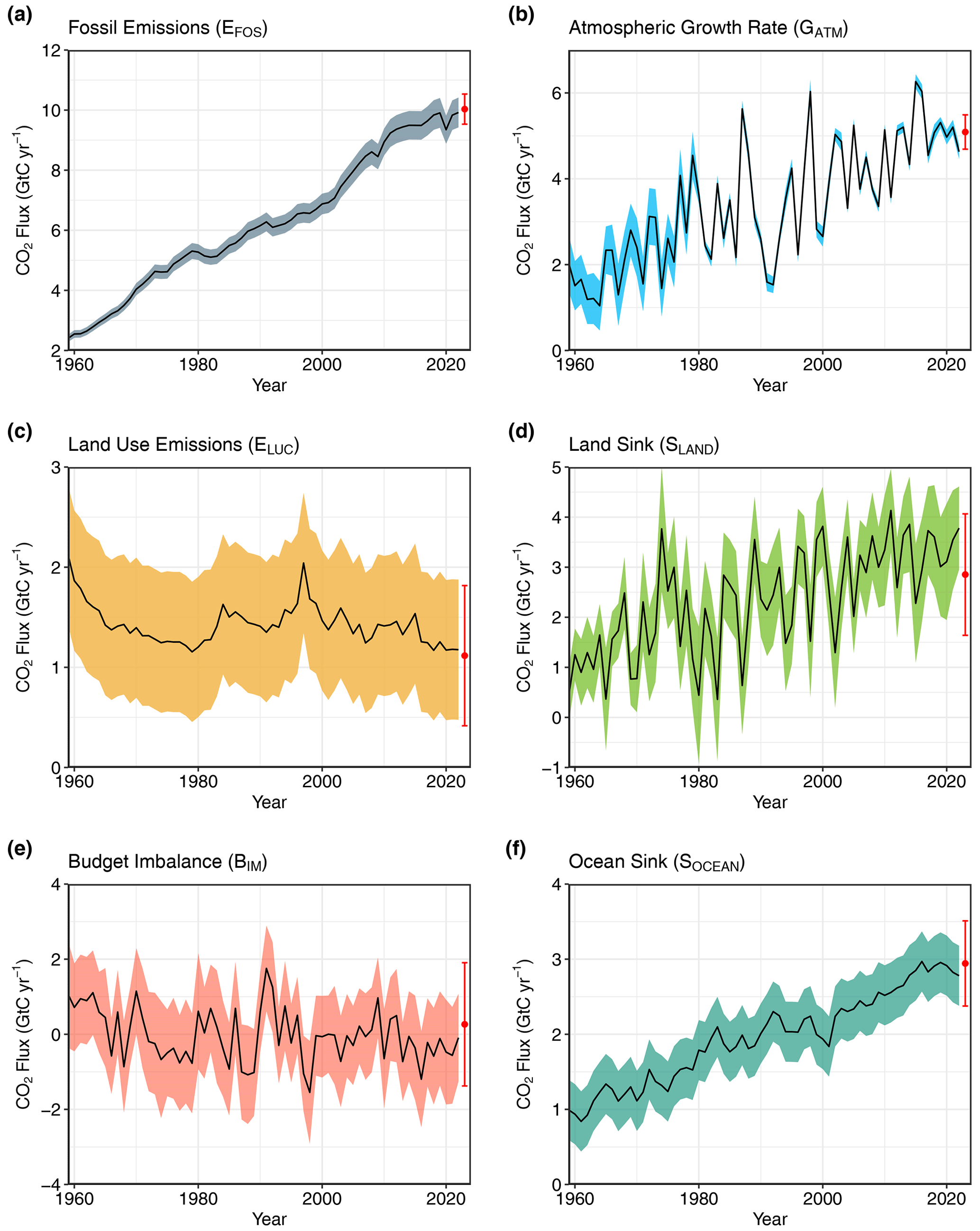
Annual CO_{2} flows from anthropogenic sources (left) into Earth's atmosphere, land, and ocean sinks (right) since year 1960. Units in equivalent gigatonnes carbon per year.

Natural sources of CO_{2} are more or less balanced by natural carbon sinks, in the form of chemical and biological processes which remove CO_{2} from the atmosphere. For example, the decay of organic material in forests, grasslands, and other land vegetation - including forest fires - results in the release of about 436 gigatonnes of CO_{2} (containing 119 gigatonnes carbon) every year, while CO_{2} uptake by new growth on land counteracts these releases, absorbing 451 Gt (123 Gt C). Although much CO_{2} in the early atmosphere of the young Earth was produced by volcanic activity, modern volcanic activity releases only 130 to 230 megatonnes of CO_{2} each year.

From the human pre-industrial era to 1940, the terrestrial biosphere represented a net source of atmospheric CO_{2} (driven largely by land-use changes), but subsequently switched to a net sink with growing fossil carbon emissions.

Carbon moves between the atmosphere, vegetation (dead and alive), the soil, the surface layer of the ocean, and the deep ocean. A detailed model has been developed by Fortunat Joos in Bern and colleagues, called the Bern model. A simpler model based on it gives the fraction of CO_{2} remaining in the atmosphere as a function of the number of years after it is emitted into the atmosphere:

$$f(t)=0.217+0.259\exp(-t/172.9)+0.338\exp(-t/18,51)+0.186\exp(-t/1.186)$$

According to this model, 21.7% of the carbon dioxide released into the air stays there forever, but of course this is not true if carbon-containing material is removed from the cycle (and stored) in ways that are not operative at present (artificial sequestration).

==== Oceanic carbon cycle ====
Air-sea exchange of CO_{2}

The Earth's oceans contain a large amount of CO_{2} in the form of bicarbonate and carbonate ions—much more than the amount in the atmosphere. The bicarbonate is produced in reactions between rock, water, and carbon dioxide.

From 1850 until 2022, the ocean has absorbed 26% of total anthropogenic emissions. However, the rate at which the ocean will take it up in the future is less certain. Even if equilibrium is reached, including dissolution of carbonate minerals, the increased concentration of bicarbonate and decreased or unchanged concentration of carbonate ion will give rise to a higher concentration of un-ionized carbonic acid and dissolved CO_{2}. This higher concentration in the seas, along with higher temperatures, would mean a higher equilibrium concentration of CO_{2} in the air.

A study published in Science Advances in 2025 concluded that faster flow of the Antarctic Circumpolar Current (ACC) at higher latitudes causes upwelling of isotopically light deep waters around Antarctica, likely increasing atmospheric carbon dioxide levels and thereby potentially constituting a critical positive feedback for future warming.

== Effects of current increase ==
=== Direct effects ===
Physical drivers of global warming that has happened so far. Future global warming potential for long lived drivers like carbon dioxide emissions is not represented. Whiskers on each bar show the possible error range.

Direct effects of increasing CO_{2} concentrations in the atmosphere include increasing global temperatures, ocean acidification and a CO_{2} fertilization effect on plants and crops.

==== Temperature rise on land ====
Changes in global temperatures over the past century provide evidence for the effects of increasing greenhouse gases. When the climate system reacts to such changes, climate change follows. Measurement of the GST is one of the many lines of evidence supporting the scientific consensus on climate change, which is that humans are causing warming of Earth's climate system.

The global average and combined land and ocean surface temperature, show a warming of 1.09 °C (range: 0.95 to 1.20 °C) from 1850–1900 to 2011–2020, based on multiple independently produced datasets. The trend is faster since the 1970s than in any other 50-year period over at least the last 2000 years.

==== Temperature rise in oceans ====
It is clear that the ocean is warming as a result of climate change, and this rate of warming is increasing. The global ocean was the warmest it had ever been recorded by humans in 2022. This is determined by the ocean heat content, which exceeded the previous 2021 maximum in 2022. The steady rise in ocean temperatures is an unavoidable result of the Earth's energy imbalance, which is primarily caused by rising levels of greenhouse gases. Between pre-industrial times and the 2011–2020 decade, the ocean's surface has heated between 0.68 and 1.01 °C.

The majority of ocean heat gain occurs in the Southern Ocean. For example, between the 1950s and the 1980s, the temperature of the Antarctic Southern Ocean rose by 0.17 °C (0.31 °F), nearly twice the rate of the global ocean.

==== Ocean acidification ====
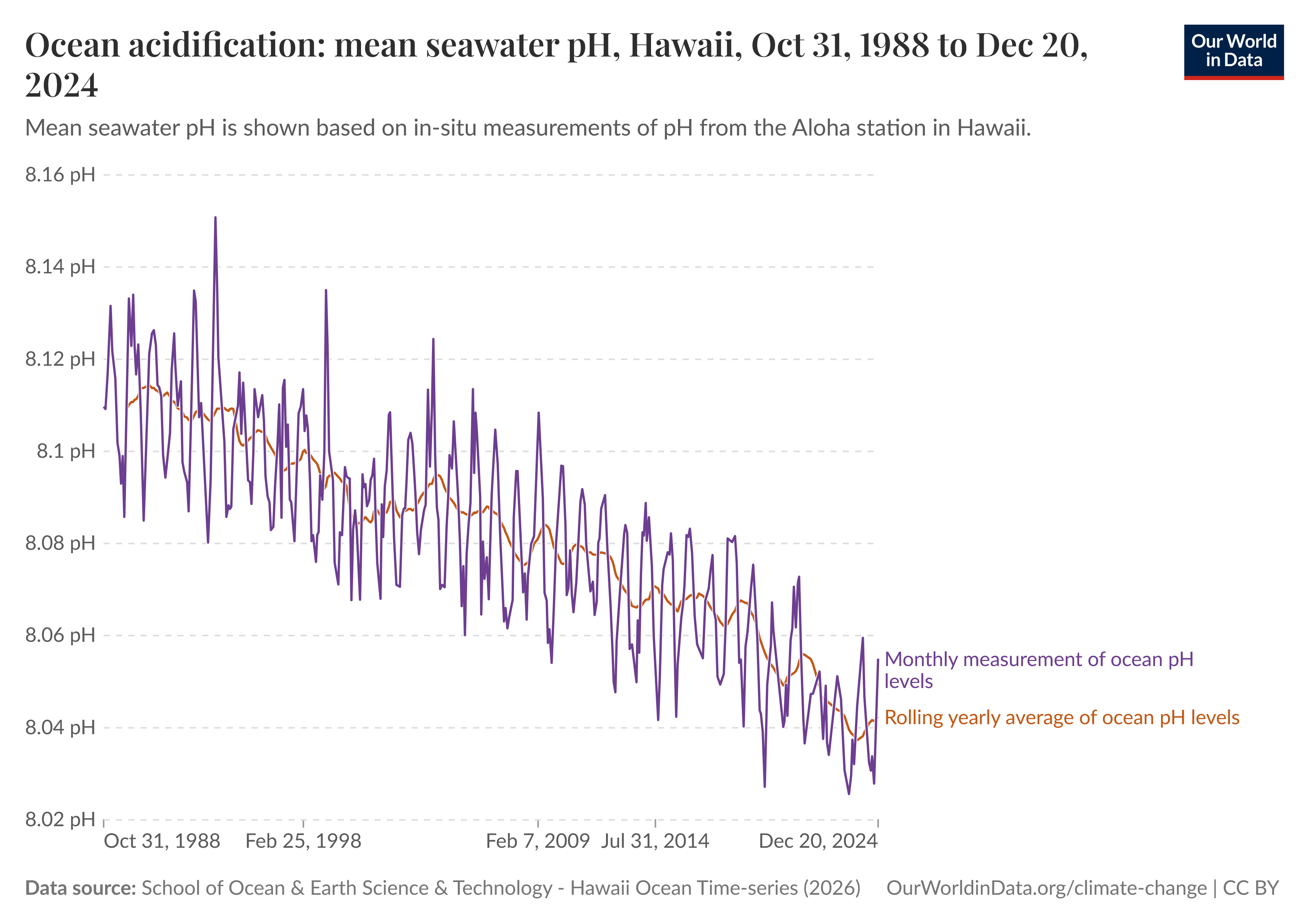
Ocean acidification means that the average seawater pH value is dropping over time.

Ocean acidification is the ongoing decrease in the pH of the Earth's ocean. Between 1950 and 2026, the average pH of the ocean surface fell from approximately 8.15 to 8.05. Carbon dioxide emissions from human activities are the primary cause of ocean acidification, with atmospheric carbon dioxide (CO_{2}) levels exceeding 422 ppm (as of 2024). CO_{2} from the atmosphere is absorbed by the oceans. This chemical reaction produces carbonic acid (H_{2}CO_{3}) which dissociates into a bicarbonate ion (HCO^{−}_{3}) and a hydrogen ion (H^{+}). The presence of free hydrogen ions (H^{+}) lowers the pH of the ocean, increasing acidity (this does not mean that seawater is acidic yet; It is still alkaline, with a pH higher than 8). Marine calcifying organisms, such as mollusks and corals, are especially vulnerable because they rely on calcium carbonate to build shells and skeletons.

A change in pH by 0.1 represents a 26% increase in hydrogen ion concentration in the world's oceans (the pH scale is logarithmic, so a change of one in pH units is equivalent to a tenfold change in hydrogen ion concentration). Sea-surface pH and carbonate saturation states vary depending on ocean depth and location. Colder and higher latitude waters are capable of absorbing more CO_{2}. This can cause acidity to rise, lowering the pH and carbonate saturation levels in these areas. Several other factors influence the atmosphere-ocean CO_{2} exchange, and thus local ocean acidification. These include ocean currents and upwelling zones, proximity to large continental rivers, sea ice coverage, and atmospheric exchange with nitrogen and sulfur from fossil fuel burning and agriculture.

==== CO_{2} fertilization effect ====
The CO_{2} fertilization effect or carbon fertilization effect causes an increased rate of photosynthesis while limiting leaf transpiration in plants. Both processes result from increased levels of atmospheric carbon dioxide (CO_{2}). The carbon fertilization effect varies depending on plant species, air and soil temperature, and availability of water and nutrients. Net primary productivity (NPP) might positively respond to the carbon fertilization effect, although evidence shows that enhanced rates of photosynthesis in plants due to CO_{2} fertilization do not directly enhance all plant growth, and thus carbon storage. The carbon fertilization effect has been reported to be the cause of 44% of gross primary productivity (GPP) increase since the 2000s. Earth System Models, Land System Models and Dynamic Global Vegetation Models are used to investigate and interpret vegetation trends related to increasing levels of atmospheric CO_{2}. However, the ecosystem processes associated with the CO_{2} fertilization effect remain uncertain and therefore are challenging to model.

Terrestrial ecosystems have reduced atmospheric CO_{2} concentrations and have partially mitigated climate change effects. The response by plants to the carbon fertilization effect is unlikely to significantly reduce atmospheric CO_{2} concentration over the next century due to the increasing anthropogenic influences on atmospheric CO_{2}. Earth's vegetated lands have shown significant greening since the early 1980s largely due to rising levels of atmospheric CO_{2}.

Theory predicts the tropics to have the largest uptake due to the carbon fertilization effect, but this has not been observed. The amount of CO_{2} uptake from CO_{2} fertilization also depends on how forests respond to climate change, and if they are protected from deforestation.

==== Other direct effects ====
CO_{2} emissions have also led to the stratosphere contracting by 400 meters since 1980, which could affect satellite operations, GPS systems and radio communications.

=== Indirect effects and impacts ===
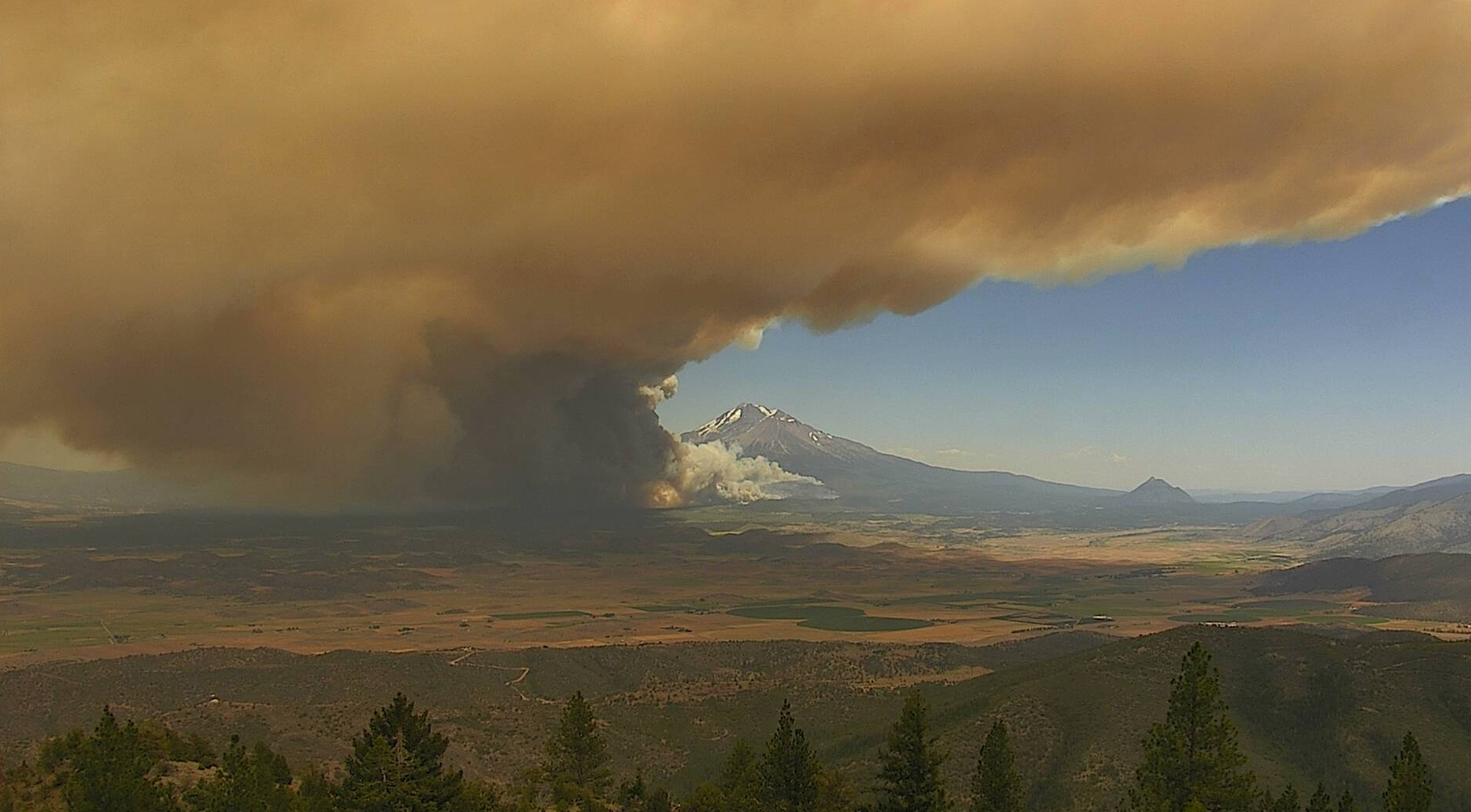
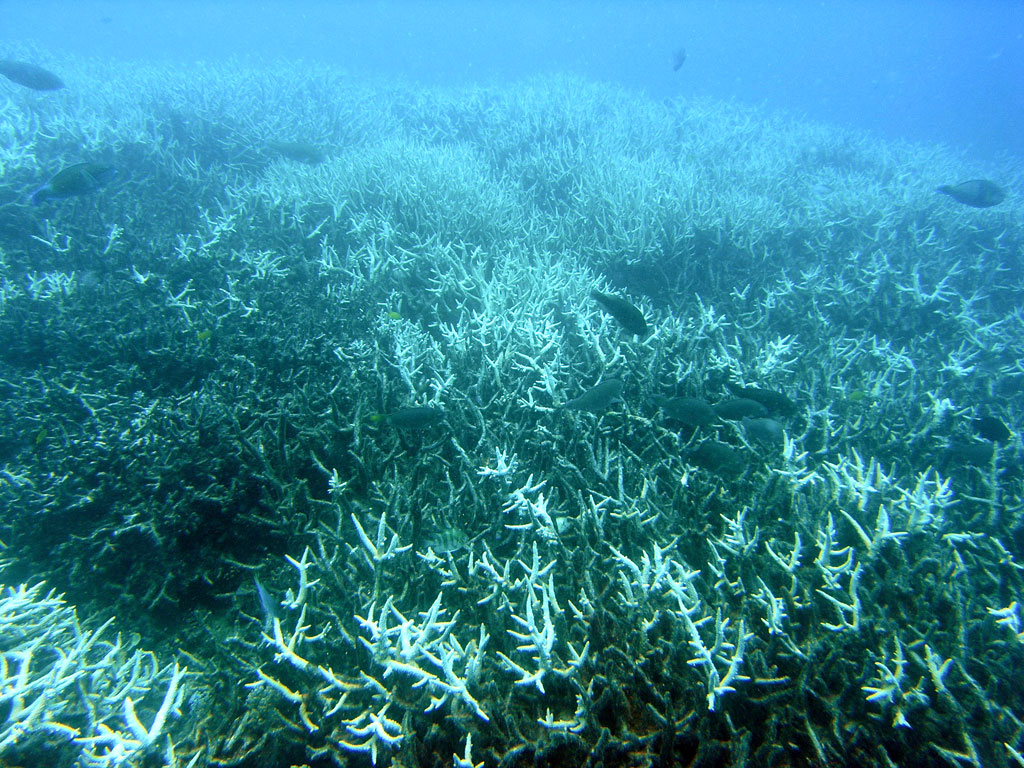
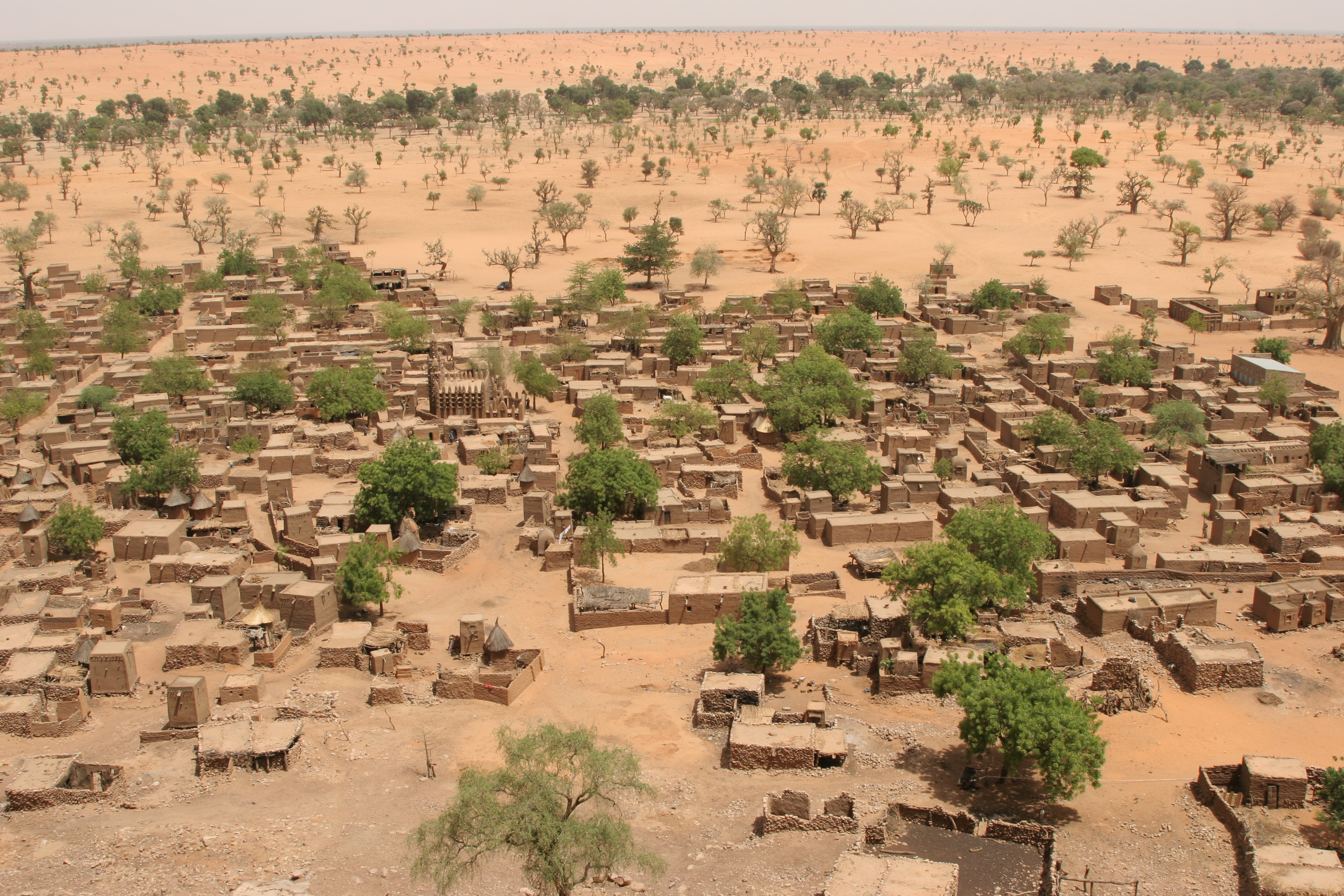
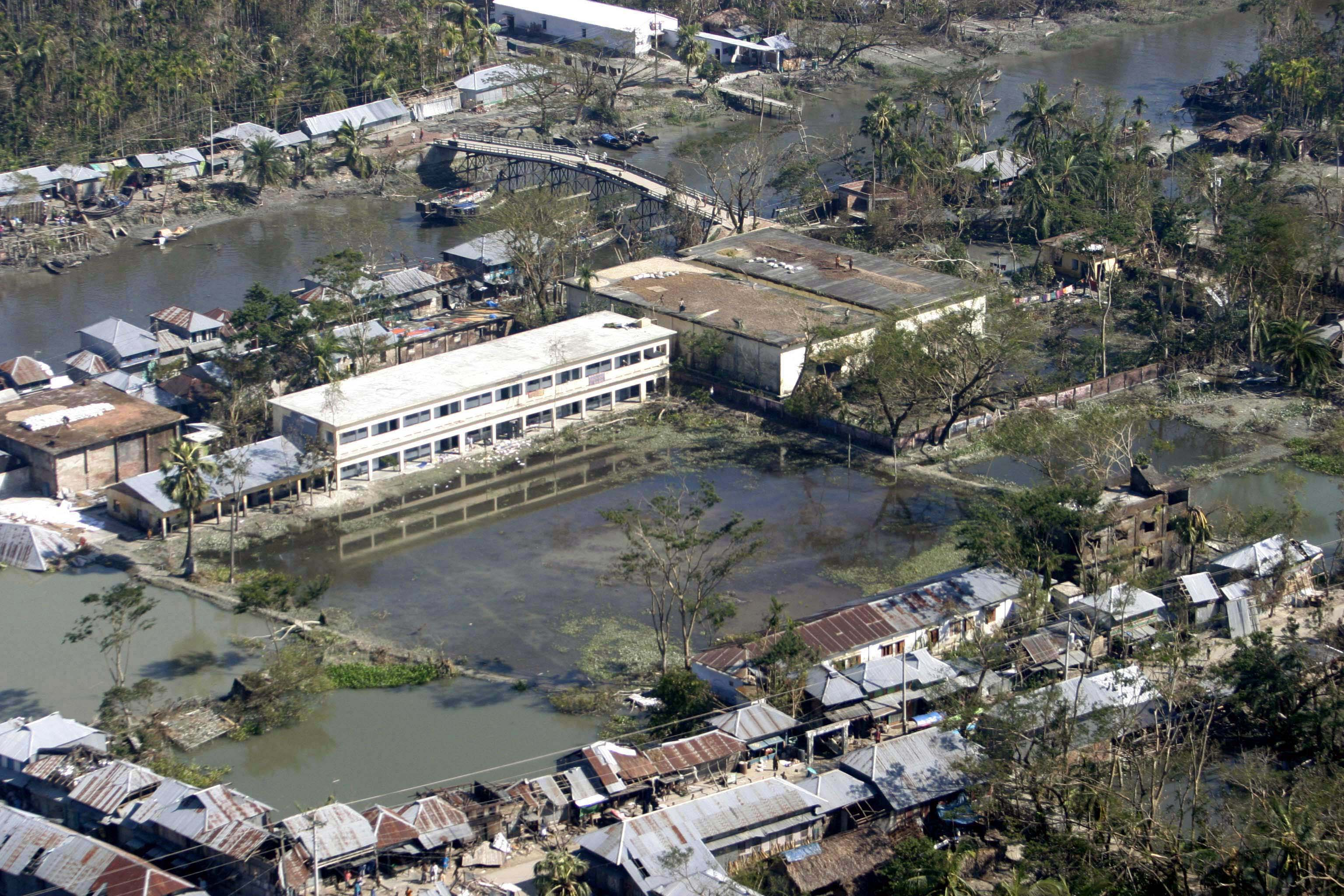
Some climate change effects, clockwise from top left: Wildfire caused by heat and dryness, bleached coral caused by ocean acidification and heating, coastal flooding caused by storms and sea level rise, and environmental migration caused by desertification

Effects of climate change are well documented and growing for Earth's natural environment and human societies. Changes to the climate system include an overall warming trend, changes to precipitation patterns, and more extreme weather. As the climate changes it impacts the natural environment with effects such as more intense forest fires, thawing permafrost, and desertification. These changes impact ecosystems and societies, and can become irreversible once tipping points are crossed. Climate activists are engaged in a range of activities around the world that seek to ameliorate these issues or prevent them from happening.

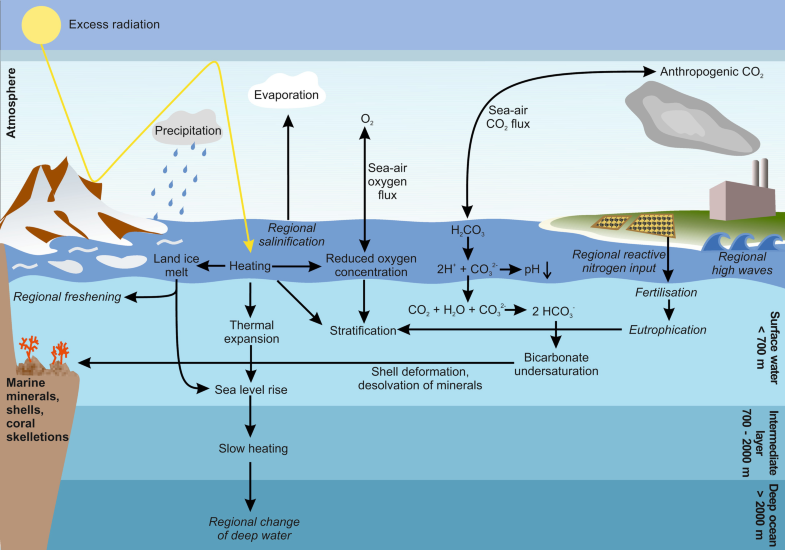
Overview of climatic changes and their effects on the ocean. Regional effects are displayed in italics.

One of the most important effects of climate change on oceans is an increase in ocean temperatures. More frequent marine heatwaves are linked to this. The rising temperature contributes to a rise in sea levels due to the expansion of water as it warms and the melting of ice sheets on land. Other effects on oceans include sea ice decline, reduced pH values and oxygen levels, as well as increased ocean stratification. All this can lead to changes in ocean currents, for example, a weakening of the Atlantic meridional overturning circulation (AMOC). The main cause of these changes is emissions of greenhouse gases from human activities, mainly burning of fossil fuels and deforestation. Carbon dioxide and methane are examples of greenhouse gases. The additional greenhouse effect leads to ocean warming because the ocean takes up most of the additional heat in the climate system. The ocean also absorbs some of the extra carbon dioxide that is in the atmosphere. This causes the pH value of the seawater to drop. Scientists estimate that the ocean absorbs about 25% of all human-caused CO_{2} emissions.

== Approaches for reducing CO_{2} concentrations ==
A model of the behavior of carbon in the atmosphere from 1 September 2014 to 31 August 2015. The height of Earth's atmosphere and topography have been vertically exaggerated and appear approximately 40 times higher than normal to show the complexity of the atmospheric flow.

Carbon dioxide has unique long-term effects on climate change that are nearly "irreversible" for a thousand years after emissions stop (zero further emissions). The greenhouse gases methane and nitrous oxide do not persist over time in the same way as carbon dioxide. Even if human carbon dioxide emissions were to completely cease, atmospheric temperatures are not expected to decrease significantly in the short term. This is because the air temperature is determined by a balance between heating, due to greenhouse gases, and cooling due to heat transfer to the ocean. If emissions were to stop, CO_{2} levels and the heating effect would slowly decrease, but simultaneously the cooling due to heat transfer would diminish (because sea temperatures would get closer to the air temperature), with the result that the air temperature would decrease only slowly. Sea temperatures would continue to rise, causing thermal expansion and some sea level rise. Lowering global temperatures more rapidly would require carbon sequestration or geoengineering.

Various techniques have been proposed for removing excess carbon dioxide from the atmosphere.

Carbon dioxide removal (CDR) is a process in which carbon dioxide (CO_{2}) is removed from Earth's atmosphere by deliberate human activities and durably stored in geological, terrestrial, or marine reservoirs, or in products. This process is also known as carbon removal, greenhouse gas removal or negative emissions. CDR is more and more often integrated into climate policy, as an element of climate change mitigation strategies. Achieving net zero emissions will require first and foremost deep and sustained cuts in emissions, and then—in addition—the use of CDR ("CDR is what puts the net into net zero emissions" ). In the future, CDR may be able to counterbalance emissions that are technically difficult to eliminate, such as some agricultural and industrial emissions.

== Concentrations in the geologic past ==
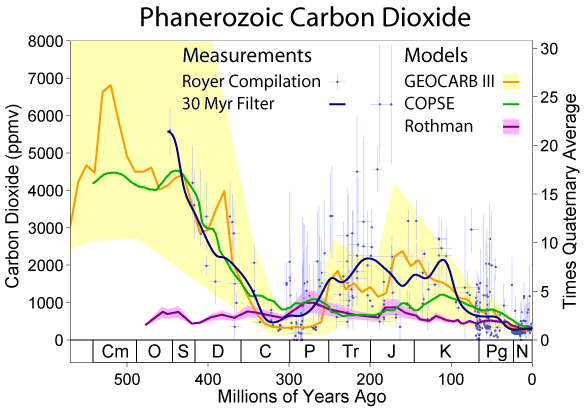
CO_{2} concentrations over the last 500 million years

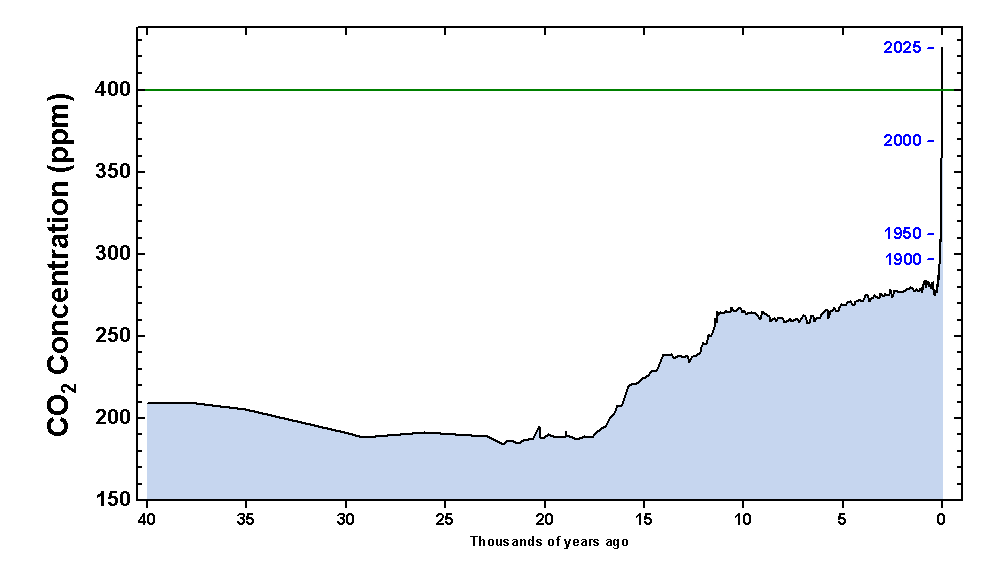
Concentration of atmospheric CO_{2} over the last 40,000 years, from the Last Glacial Maximum to the present day. The current rate of increase is much higher than at any point during the last deglaciation.

Graphs of carbon dioxide concentration and temperature over time.

Estimates in 2023 found that the current carbon dioxide concentration in the atmosphere may be the highest it has been in the last 14 million years. However the IPCC Sixth Assessment Report estimated similar levels 3 to 3.3 million years ago in the mid-Pliocene warm period. This period can be a proxy for likely climate outcomes with current levels of CO_{2}.

Carbon dioxide is believed to have played an important effect in regulating Earth's temperature throughout its 4.54 billion year history. Early in the Earth's life, scientists have found evidence of liquid water indicating a warm world even though the Sun's output is believed to have only been 70% of what it is today. Higher carbon dioxide concentrations in the early Earth's atmosphere might help explain this faint young sun paradox. When Earth first formed, Earth's atmosphere may have contained more greenhouse gases and CO_{2} concentrations may have been higher, with estimated partial pressure as large as 1,000 kPa (10 bar), because there was no bacterial photosynthesis to reduce the gas to carbon compounds and oxygen. Methane, a very active greenhouse gas, may have been more prevalent as well.

Carbon dioxide concentrations have shown several cycles of variation from about 180 parts per million during the deep glaciations of the Holocene and Pleistocene to 280 parts per million during the interglacial periods. Carbon dioxide concentrations have varied widely over the Earth's history. It is believed to have been present in Earth's first atmosphere, shortly after Earth's formation. The second atmosphere, consisting largely of nitrogen and CO_{2} was produced by outgassing from volcanism, supplemented by gases produced during the Late Heavy Bombardment of Earth by huge asteroids. A major part of carbon dioxide emissions were soon dissolved in water and incorporated in carbonate sediments.

The production of free oxygen by cyanobacterial photosynthesis eventually led to the oxygen catastrophe that ended Earth's second atmosphere and brought about the Earth's third atmosphere (the modern atmosphere) 2.4 billion years ago. Carbon dioxide concentrations dropped from 4,000 parts per million during the Cambrian period about 500 million years ago to as low as 180 parts per million 20,000 years ago .

=== Drivers of ancient-Earth CO_{2} concentration ===
On long timescales, atmospheric CO_{2} concentration is determined by the balance among geochemical processes including organic carbon burial in sediments, silicate rock weathering, and volcanic degassing. The net effect of slight imbalances in the carbon cycle over tens to hundreds of millions of years has been to reduce atmospheric CO_{2}. On a timescale of billions of years, such downward trend appears bound to continue indefinitely as occasional massive historical releases of buried carbon due to volcanism will become less frequent (as earth mantle cooling and progressive exhaustion of internal radioactive heat proceed further). The rates of these processes are extremely slow; hence they are of no relevance to the atmospheric CO_{2} concentration over the next hundreds or thousands of years.

=== Photosynthesis in the geologic past ===
Over the course of Earth's geologic history CO_{2} concentrations have played a role in biological evolution. The first photosynthetic organisms probably evolved early in the evolutionary history of life and most likely used reducing agents such as hydrogen or hydrogen sulfide as sources of electrons, rather than water. Cyanobacteria appeared later, and the excess oxygen they produced contributed to the oxygen catastrophe, which rendered the evolution of complex life possible. In recent geologic times, low CO_{2} concentrations below 600 parts per million might have been the stimulus that favored the evolution of C_{4} plants which increased greatly in abundance between 7 and 5 million years ago over plants that use the less efficient C_{3} metabolic pathway. At current atmospheric pressures photosynthesis shuts down when atmospheric CO_{2} concentrations fall below 150 ppm and 200 ppm although some microbes can extract carbon from the air at much lower concentrations.

=== Measuring ancient-Earth CO_{2} concentration ===
Over 400,000 years of ice core data: Graph of CO_{2} (green), reconstructed temperature (blue) and dust (red) from the Vostok ice core

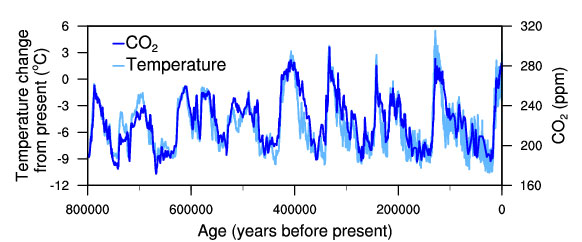
Correspondence between temperature and atmospheric CO_{2} during the last 800,000 years

The most direct method for measuring atmospheric carbon dioxide concentrations for periods before instrumental sampling is to measure bubbles of air (fluid or gas inclusions) trapped in the Antarctic or Greenland ice sheets. The most widely accepted of such studies come from a variety of Antarctic cores and indicate that atmospheric CO_{2} concentrations were about 260–280 ppm immediately before industrial emissions began and did not vary much from this level during the preceding 10,000 years. The longest ice core record comes from East Antarctica, where ice has been sampled to an age of 800,000 years. During this time, the atmospheric carbon dioxide concentration has varied between 180 and 210 ppm during ice ages, increasing to 280–300 ppm during warmer interglacials.

CO_{2} mole fractions in the atmosphere have gone up by around 35 percent since the 1900s, rising from 280 parts per million by volume to 387 parts per million in 2009. One study using evidence from stomata of fossilized leaves suggests greater variability, with CO_{2} mole fractions above 300 ppm during the period ten to seven thousand years ago, though others have argued that these findings more likely reflect calibration or contamination problems rather than actual CO_{2} variability. Because of the way air is trapped in ice (pores in the ice close off slowly to form bubbles deep within the firn) and the time period represented in each ice sample analyzed, these figures represent averages of atmospheric concentrations of up to a few centuries rather than annual or decadal levels.

Ice cores provide evidence for greenhouse gas concentration variations over the past 800,000 years. Both CO_{2} and CH_{4} concentrations vary between glacial and interglacial phases, and these variations correlate strongly with temperature. Direct data does not exist for periods earlier than those represented in the ice core record, a record that indicates that CO_{2} mole fractions stayed within a range of 180 ppm to 280 ppm throughout the last 800,000 years, until the increase of the last 250 years. However, various proxy measurements and models suggest larger variations in past epochs: 500 million years ago CO_{2} levels were likely 10 times higher than now.

Various proxy measurements have been used to try to determine atmospheric CO_{2} concentrations millions of years in the past. These include boron and carbon isotope ratios in certain types of marine sediments, and the numbers of stomata observed on fossil plant leaves.

Phytane is a type of diterpenoid alkane. It is a breakdown product of chlorophyll, and is now used to estimate ancient CO_{2} levels. Phytane gives both a continuous record of CO_{2} concentrations but it also can overlap a break in the CO_{2} record of over 500 million years.

==== 720 to 400 million years ago ====
Geochemical modelling suggests that prior to the mid-Ordovician (450 million years ago) atmospheric CO_{2} reached 1000s of ppm, but proxy evidence of this time remains unreliable. Some Phytane estimates of the Ordovician suggest concentrations of ~300-700ppm.

Indeed, higher CO_{2} concentrations are thought to have prevailed throughout most of the Phanerozoic Eon, with concentrations four to six times current concentrations during the Mesozoic era, and ten to fifteen times current concentrations during the early Palaeozoic era until the middle of the Devonian period, about 400 million years ago. The spread of land plants is thought to have reduced CO_{2} concentrations during the late Devonian, and plant activities as both sources and sinks of CO_{2} have since been important in providing stabilizing feedbacks.

Earlier in Earth's history, in the Neoproterozoic Era, an 82-million year period of intermittent, widespread glaciation extending to the equator (Snowball Earth) ended suddenly at 635 Ma. after CO_{2} released during volcanic outgassing built up to ~12% (~120,000 ppm). This caused extreme greenhouse conditions, rapid deglaciation, and carbonate deposition as limestone at rates which may have been as fast as 40 cm per year. The end of the Snowball Earth glaciations marks the transition between the Cryogenian and Ediacaran Periods, and may have contributed to the radiation of metazoan life in the Phanerozoic.

==== 60 to 5 million years ago ====
Atmospheric CO_{2} concentration continued to fall after about 60 million years ago. About 34 million years ago, the time of the Eocene–Oligocene extinction event and when the Antarctic ice sheet started to take its current form, CO_{2} was about 760 ppm, and there is geochemical evidence that concentrations were less than 300 ppm by about 20 million years ago. Decreasing CO_{2} concentration, with a tipping point of 600 ppm, was the primary agent forcing Antarctic glaciation. Low CO_{2} concentrations may have been the stimulus that favored the evolution of C_{4} plants, which increased greatly in abundance between 7 and 5 million years ago.

== See also ==
- Carbon budget
- Global surface temperature
