= Abraham Dee Bartlett =

British taxidermist and zoo official (1812–1897)

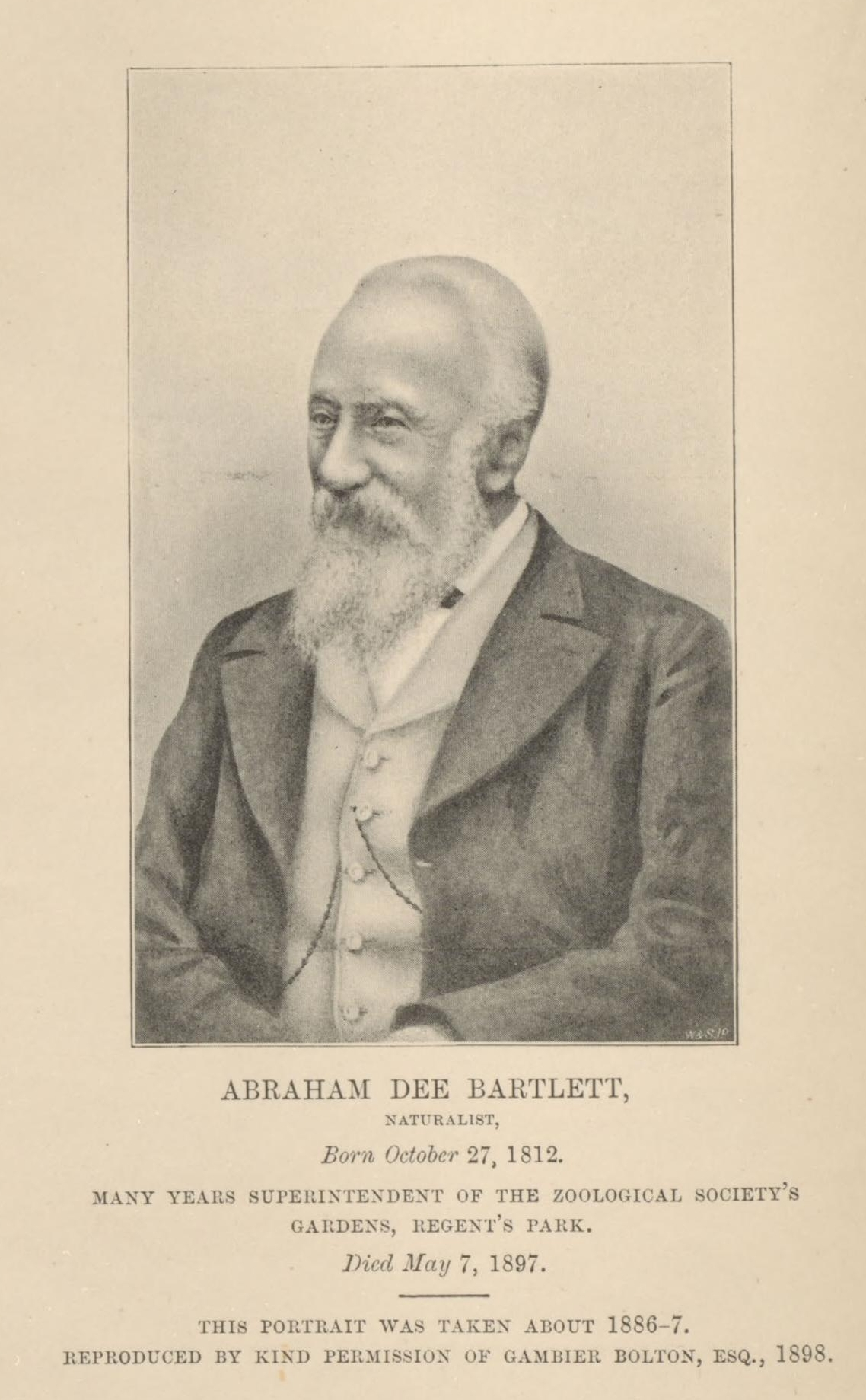
Bartlett in 1886

Abraham Dee Bartlett (27 October 1812 – 7 May 1897) was a British taxidermist and an expert on captive animals. A superintendent of the London Zoo, he was a prominent observer of animal life and a zoologist who became a popular authority on wildlife. Bartlett brought the London Zoo into prominence and was associated with many naturalists including Charles Darwin.

== Early life ==
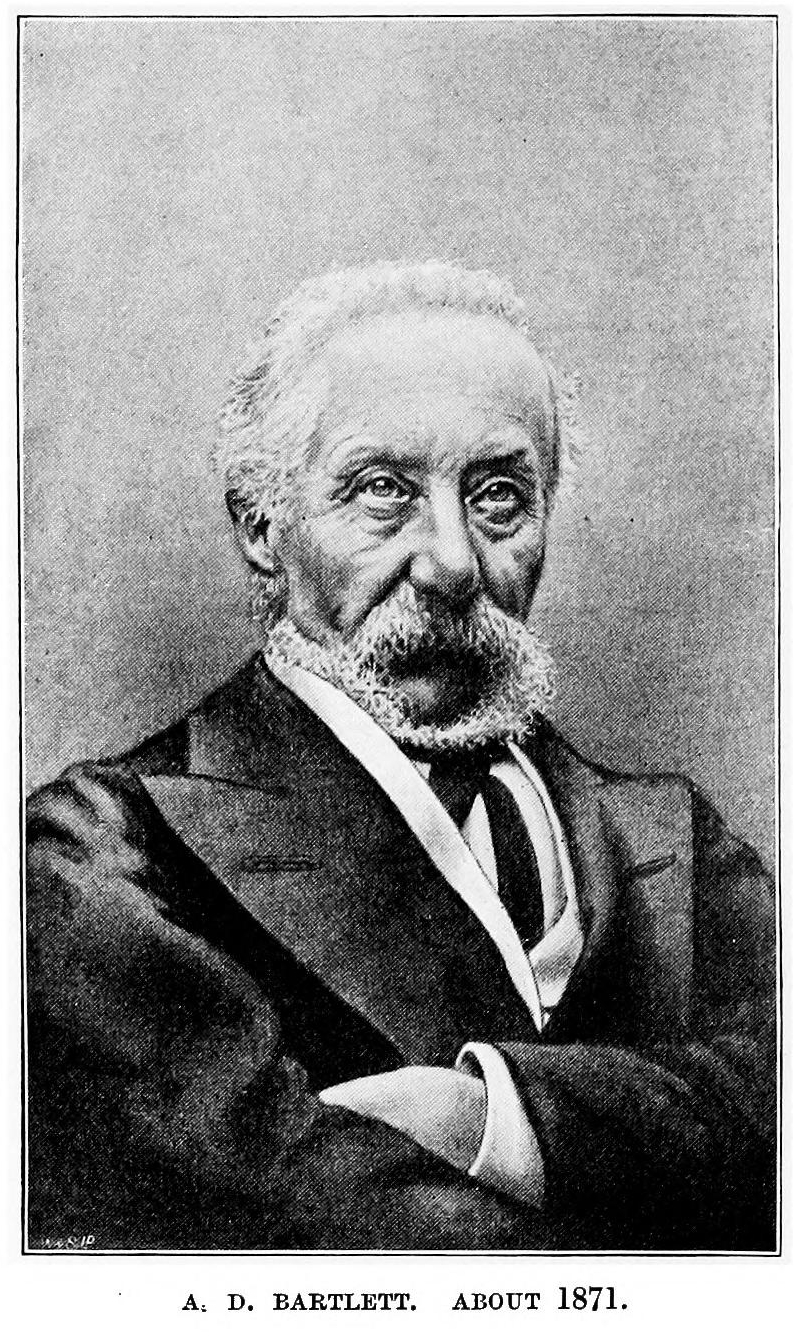
Bartlett in 1871

Abraham was the second son of John Bartlett and Jane Dunster. John Bartlett had apprenticed under William Turner, father of J. M. W. Turner, the famous artist, and was a hairdresser and brushmaker. Abraham became interested in animals as a child and was allowed by his father's friend, Edward Cross, owner of the menagerie Exeter Exchange in the Strand, to make regular visits. This interest led to Cross introducing him to taxidermy. He, however, began to work as an apprentice to his father in the hairdressing business before he shifted to taxidermy in 1834. His taxidermy business near the British Museum was so successful that he was able to move to a larger home, and towards the end of his life, he owned three houses. He married Lydia Norvall and had four daughters and two sons.

He became a member of the Zoological Society of London thanks to a physician named Anthony White who introduced him to others including William Yarrell, W. Ogilby, John Gould and D. W. Mitchell. He then became a secretary of the society.

== London Zoo ==
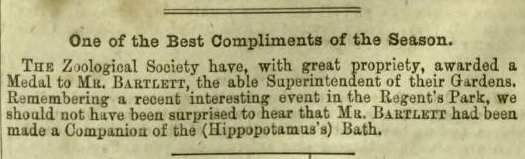
Punch magazine joking in January, 1873

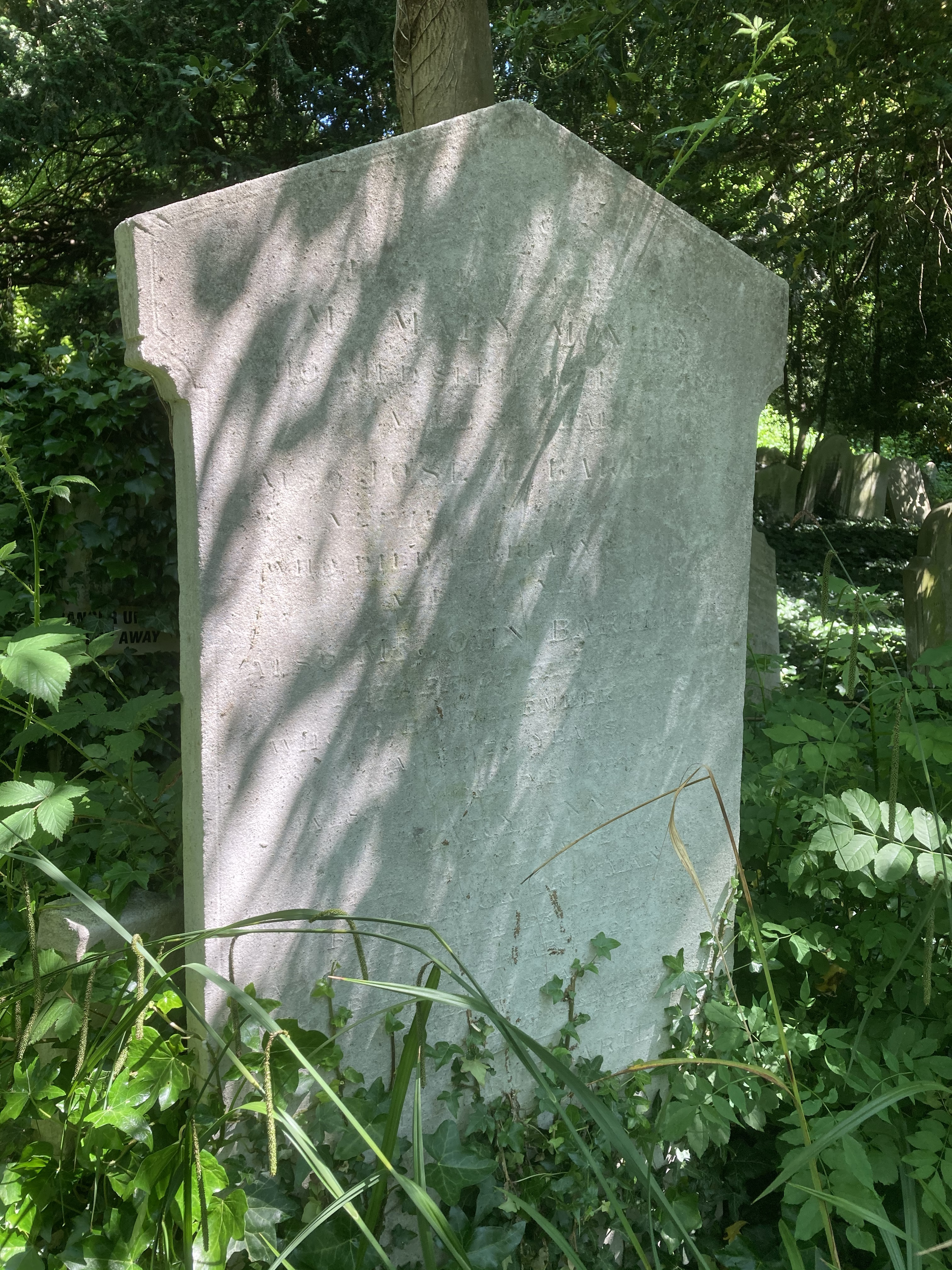
Bartlett family grave in Highgate Cemetery

Bartlett supported D. W. Mitchell on the idea that the collection of animals held by the Zoological Society of London could be made accessible to the public for a small fee that could help the society. It was open on Mondays for a fee of six pence. Queen Victoria gave him a gold watch for taking care of her pet birds. Dead birds were sent to him for taxidermic preservation, and for his excellent exhibits, he received a gold medal at the Great Exhibition of 1851. He was among the first to reconstruct a specimen of the dodo, and this was displayed at Sydenham Crystal Palace, where he was also appointed naturalist around 1852. The restoration was destroyed, though, in the 1866 fire. He associated himself with the Zoological Society and was offered the position of superintendent made vacant by the death of John Thompson at the garden in Regents Park in 1859. As superintendent, Bartlett became a familiar figure for visiting naturalists and corresponded with many across the world. He was an agent for the acquisition of wild animals from suppliers such as Edward Blyth and was involved in their sale to circus agents such as P.T. Barnum. He kept the position at the zoo, and became a familiar figure until his death. He became an authority on the care of wild animals and published papers in the Proceedings of the Zoological Society and other journals. He received a silver medal from the Zoological Society in 1872 and was made an associate of the Linnean Society in 1879. Charles Darwin often discussed his ideas on sexual selection with Bartlett. He noted, for instance: "I asked Mr. Bartlett, of the Zoological Gardens, who has had very large experience with birds, whether the male tragopan (one of the Gallinaceae) was polygamous, and I was struck by his answering, 'I do not know, but I should think so from his splendid colours.'" When Darwin was studying the facial expressions of wild animals, he was introduced to the artistic and observational abilities of Joseph Wolf by Bartlett. Wolf was able to make illustrations of fleeting facial expressions for Darwin, although Wolf himself had reservations about Darwin's interpretations.

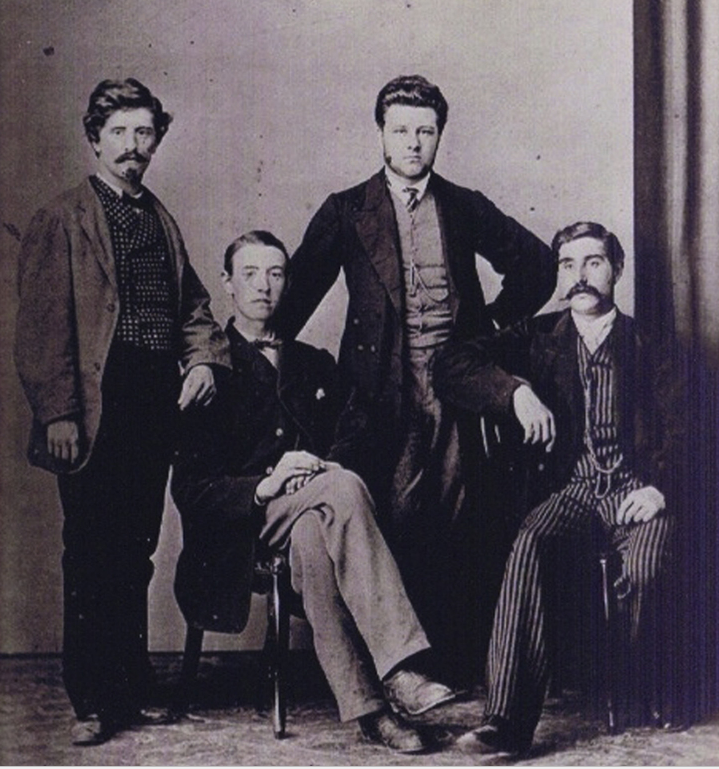
Left to right: Charles Rice, Carl Hagenbeck, Clarence Bartlett and William Jamrach

In 1882, Bartlett became unpopular after deciding to sell the popular African elephant Jumbo to P. T. Barnum for £2000. A case was made against the sale, but the courts ruled against any interference.

A species of bird of paradise Paradisaea bartletti was named after Bartlett by William Goodwin in 1860 based on a female specimen. This was later identified as a synonym of the already described Paradisaea minor.

Bartlett died in the zoo premises on 7 May 1897, after suffering from an illness, and was buried on the west side of Highgate Cemetery. His son, Clarence, who had been assistant superintendent at the zoo, took his position as superintendent. Another son, Edward Bartlett, also became a taxidermist who collected specimens in Peru and became a curator at the Maidstone Museum and the Raja Brooke's museum, in Sarawak. Several writings by Bartlett were published after his death in two books, Wild Animals in Captivity (1898) and Life among Wild Beasts in the Zoo (1900). The Bartlett Society, a zoo history group established by Clinton Keeling, was founded in his honor in 1984.
