= Clinton Keeling =

British zoologist

Clinton Keeling FZS
- Born: 3 January 1932; Westcliff-on-Sea, Essex, United Kingdom
- Died: 2007 (aged 74–75)
- Occupations: Zoologist, zookeeper, writer
- Years active: 1954–2007
- Known for: Founder of The Bartlett Society, proprietor of Ashover Zoological Garden
- Spouses: Jill Shaw (m. 1953, divorced) Pamela Bailey (m. 1979)
- Children: 4

Clinton Harry Keeling FZS (3 January 1932 – 2007) was a British zoologist, zookeeper, and writer. A Fellow of the Zoological Society of London, Keeling founded the Bartlett Society in 1984 to study historical methods of keeping wild animals.

== Biography ==
Clinton Harry Keeling was born to Arthur and Alice Louise Keeling (née Lent) in Westcliff-on-Sea, Essex, on 3 January 1932. He was the eldest of four children. In 1954, Keeling and his wife Jill founded Ashover Zoological Garden (Note: Keeling reportedly disliked the abbreviation "zoo") (also known as Pan's Zoological and Botanical Gardens) at Hill Top House – Jill's family home in Ashover, Derbyshire. The zoo opened at Easter 1955, and had approximately 250 animals including the bear used in the TV advertisements for Sugar Puffs. One year the bear escaped from its captivity, and was recaptured after being seen by a nearby agricultural worker.

In the late 1950s and early 1960s, he had a series of books published by Foyles, including Unusual Pets (1959), Cavies (1961), and Mice and Rats (1961). He followed these with a series of Meet the... books published by Harrap throughout the 1960s.

Pan's Garden closed in 1971.

Between 1984 and 2003, Keeling self-published a series of books on long-closed zoos, with titles such as Where the Lion Trod (1984), Where the Crane Danced (1985), Where the Zebu Grazed (1989), Where the Elephant Walked (1991), Where the Macaw Preened (1993), Where the Penguin Plunged (1995). Where the Leopard Lazed (1999), Where the Peacock Screamed (2002), and Where the Camel Strode (2003). A tenth volume, Where the Coati Climbed, was not published. He also wrote books on the Belle Vue Zoological Gardens in Manchester, Dudley Zoo, Central Park Zoo, Knowsley Safari Park, London Zoo, and Whipsnade Zoo.

On 27 October 1984, Keeling founded the Bartlett Society (named after the 19th-century zoologist Abraham Dee Bartlett) to study historical methods of keeping wild animals.

Keeling was a travelling lecturer on zoology, and gave up to 400 talks per year to schools across the country. He had an interest in cryptozoology and hybrid animals, and his book Ligers, Tigons and Other Hybrid Mammals was published posthumously in 2016. He guest-wrote for publications including BBC Wildlife.

== Personal life ==
Keeling married Jill Annette Shaw, an English teacher at St George's School, Ascot, on 24 August 1953. They had four children – sons Anthony and Jeremy and daughters Diana and Phoebe. Jeremy, who co-founded Monkey World, described the family as "dysfunctional" and how his parents' naivety caused an "ambivalent approach to safety" at Pan's Garden. He wrote how his father was "a working class man with delusions of grandeur", whose fondness for books was matched only by an "absence of practical aptitude". Clinton and Jill's marriage was not a loving one, and Clinton was reportedly amused by Jeremy's distress when Jill was caught having an affair. Clinton later left Jill for a "rich divorcée", divorced Jill in 1974 and later married Pamela Bailey on 7 February 1979.

In the 1970s, Keeling was described politically as "ex-Conservative" and religiously agnostic. At other times he described himself as a practising Christian. He lived in Shalford, Surrey, and died in 2007.

== Publications ==
The Bartlett Society credits Keeling with 54 publications:

- Unusual Pets (1958)
- Cavies (1961)
- Mice and Rats as Pets (1961)
- Baby Animals (1962)
- Meet the Mammals (1962)
- Meet the Reptiles (1964)
- Meet the Birds (1968)
- Keeling's Ark (1970)
- Odd Animals (1976)
- Under the Sea (1978)
- The Life and Death of Belle Vue (1983)
- Where the Lion Trod (1984)
- Where the Crane Danced (1985)
- The Ashover Zoological Garden (1986)
- A Beginner's Guide to Keeping Frogs and Lizards (1986)
- Dwarf Hamsters (1987)
- They All Came Into the Ark (1988)
- New Look at Animals (1989)
- They Live at the Castle (1989)
- Where the Zebu Grazed (1989)
- Belle Vue Bygones (1990)
- Whipsnade's War (1990)
- In the Beginning (1991)
- Where the Elephant Walked (1991)
- A Short History of British Reptile Keeping (1992)
- Here, There and Regent's Park (1992)
- The Fragments That Remain (1992)
- What's in a Name? (1993)
- Where the Macaw Preened (1993)
- One Man and His Animals (1994)
- Where the Penguin Plunged (1995)
- Wonderful Year (1995)
- The Chessington Story (1996)
- Remember Belle Vue (1997)
- The Bristol Book (1998)
- Sir Peter's Way (1999)
- Where the Leopard Lazed (1999)
- The Marvel by the Mersey (2000)
- Year of Janus (2000)
- Bits about Birds (2001)
- E Tenebris (2001)
- Skyscrapers and Sealions (2002)
- Where the Peacock Screamed (2002)
- Little Acorns Grow (2003)
- Where the Camel Strode (2003)
- Chessington Notebook (2005)
- Lubetkin's Legacy (2006)
- Ligers, Tigons and Other Hybrid Mammals (2016)
- A New Look at Animals (Note: The Bartlett Society does not give a publication date)
- Not Gorillas Again!
- A Young Person's Guide to Animal Names
- The Changing Land
- 101 Questions Answered about Animals
- Shopping Safari
