= Ralph Keeling =

- Born: 1957 (age 68–69)
- Education: Yale University, Harvard University
- Awards: Rosenstiel Award, Humboldt Research Award
- Scientific career
- Workplaces: Scripps Institution of Oceanography

External videos
- Ralph Keeling, “The (Ralph) Keeling Curve”, Scripps Institution of Oceanography

Ralph Franklin Keeling (born 1957) is a professor at Scripps Institution of Oceanography. He is the Principal Investigator for the Atmospheric Oxygen Research Group at Scripps and is the director of the Scripps CO_{2} Program, the measurement program behind the Keeling Curve, which was started by his father Charles David Keeling in 1958. Ralph Keeling has developed precise instruments and techniques for the measurement of atmospheric oxygen and anthropogenic CO_{2} in the ocean, and for the analysis of land and ocean carbon sinks.

== Education ==
Ralph Keeling, one of five children of Charles David and Louise (Barthold) Keeling, grew up in Del Mar, California. Ralph Keeling received a B.S. in physics from Yale University in 1979. He received a Ph.D. in applied physics from Harvard University in 1988 for developing a novel technique for the accurate measurement of atmospheric oxygen.

== Research ==
Keeling developed his first scientific instrument, a light-gauging interferometer for the accurate measurement of atmospheric oxygen, as part of his Ph.D. research. By October 25, 1986, Keeling had developed a working prototype, a stainless steel box about seven feet tall, with a glass front. Inside the box, light beams shine through the gas molecules of air samples. Keeling's interferometer measures the speed of light at different wavelengths and determines the specific composition of the air and its oxygen content based on tiny variations in speed. The instrument Keeling developed was able to measure oxygen at a far more precise level than anything previously created, detecting differences of a few molecules per million.

Keeling's Interferometric Oxygen Analyzer has enabled Keeling and many others to study atmospheric composition, the global carbon cycle, ocean biogeochemistry, paleoclimate and climate change. Keeling has collected data since 1989, leading to fundamental discoveries about the carbon cycle. His data indicates that atmospheric oxygen levels are dropping, in a curve that resembles the inverse of the Keeling curve for CO_{2}. However, the rate at which oxygen levels are decreasing is not as great as would be expected given the increase in CO_{2}.

In a "landmark study" in 1996, Keeling demonstrated that land and ocean carbon sinks could be compared by examining the partial pressures of atmospheric oxygen and CO_{2}. Keeling's data supports the view that the land operates as a major carbon sink. Keeling also discovered that the land, trees and plants are absorbing CO_{2} at a higher rate than they have in the past. Although the land is releasing millions of tons of CO_{2} as a result of deforestation, thawing of permafrost, and other global warming-related phenomena, plants are growing faster and taking up more CO_{2} in response. This trend is not enough to counter rising CO_{2} levels in the atmosphere, but it is slowing their increase.

Keeling is active in studying ocean warming, stratification of the upper ocean, and ocean deoxygenation. Ocean models predict declines in oxygen, and significant deoxygenation has been observed over the last fifty years in both North Pacific and tropical oceans. Keeling has studied Antarctic ice and glacial CO_{2} with Britton B. Stephens, modeling concentrations of atmospheric CO_{2} during both glacial and interglacial periods. With Stephens and others, Keeling hypothesizes about oceanographic processes that may have stabilized and destabilized the oceans over time, in particular about possible thermostatic effects of Antarctic ice. He studies Thermohaline circulation and circulation patterns in the Southern Ocean to better understand oceanic warming.

Keeling is also involved in monitoring of local emissions over Los Angeles, including methane.

Keeling is a strong proponent of ongoing measurement of atmospheric factors such as oxygen and carbon dioxide. He has appealed to government and to the public for continued funding to ensure that data continues to be recorded for the Keeling Curve and other scientific measures that monitor the air, land, and oceans. He is also a proponent of improved monitoring of the oceans.

== Awards and honors ==
Keeling received the Rosenstiel Award in 1992, was an H. Burr Steinbach Visiting Scholar at Woods Hole Oceanographic Institution in 1998, and received the Humboldt Research Award in 2009 in recognition of his career achievements.

== See also ==
- Keeling Curve
