= Mauna Loa Observatory =

Atmospheric research station on island of Hawaii

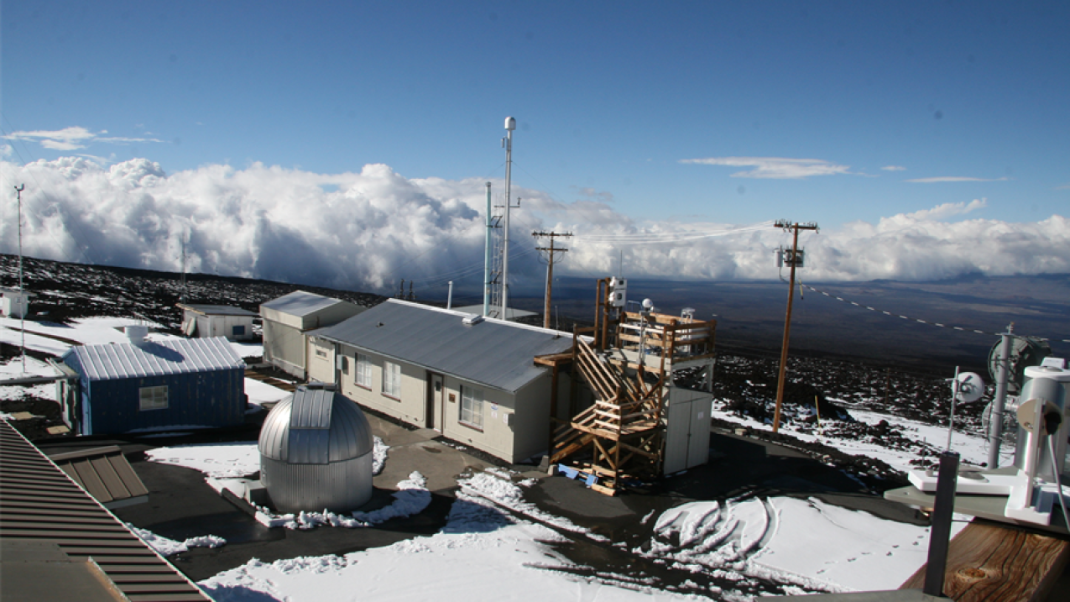
Mauna Loa Observatory.

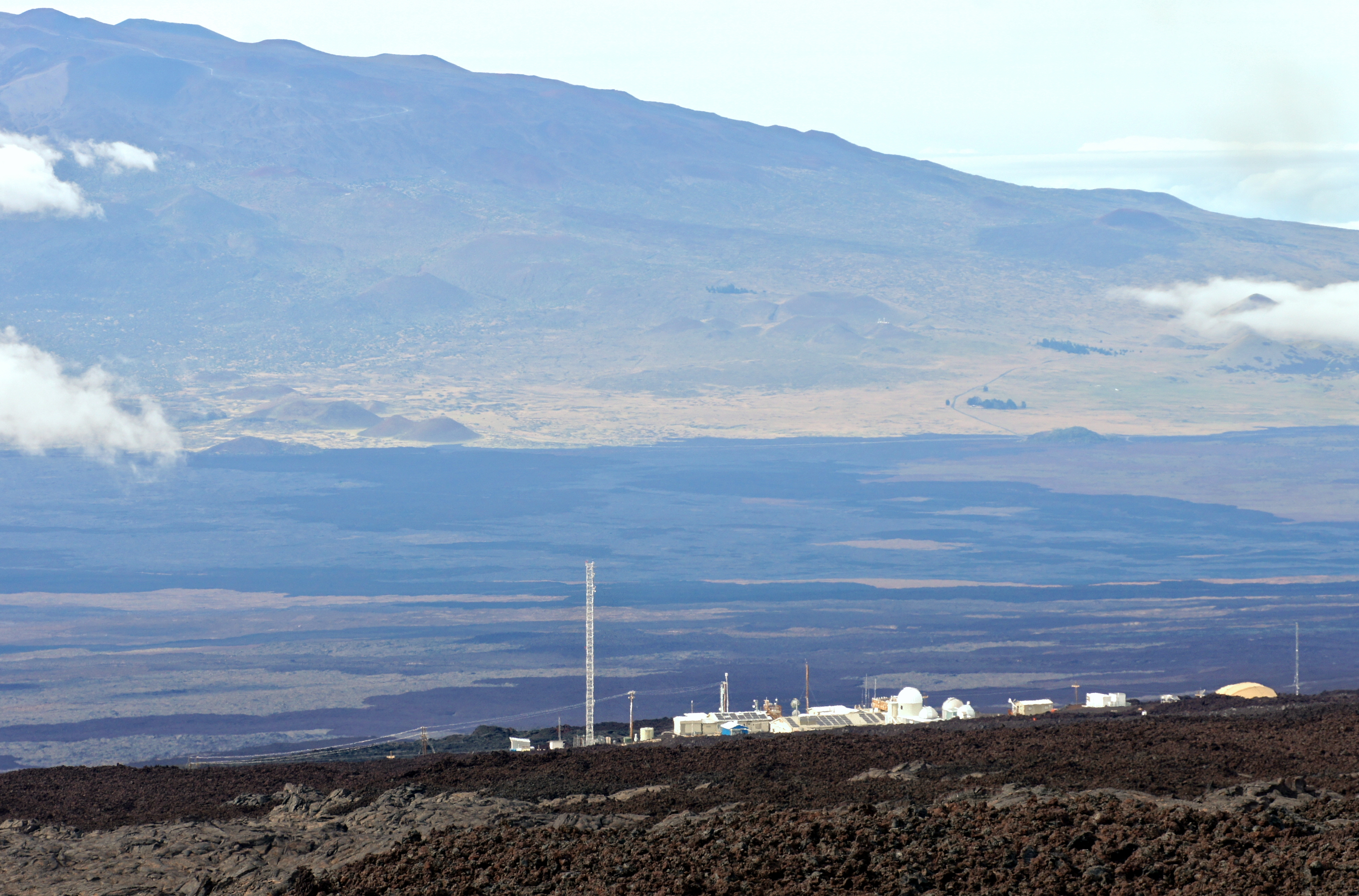
The observatory on Mauna Loa.

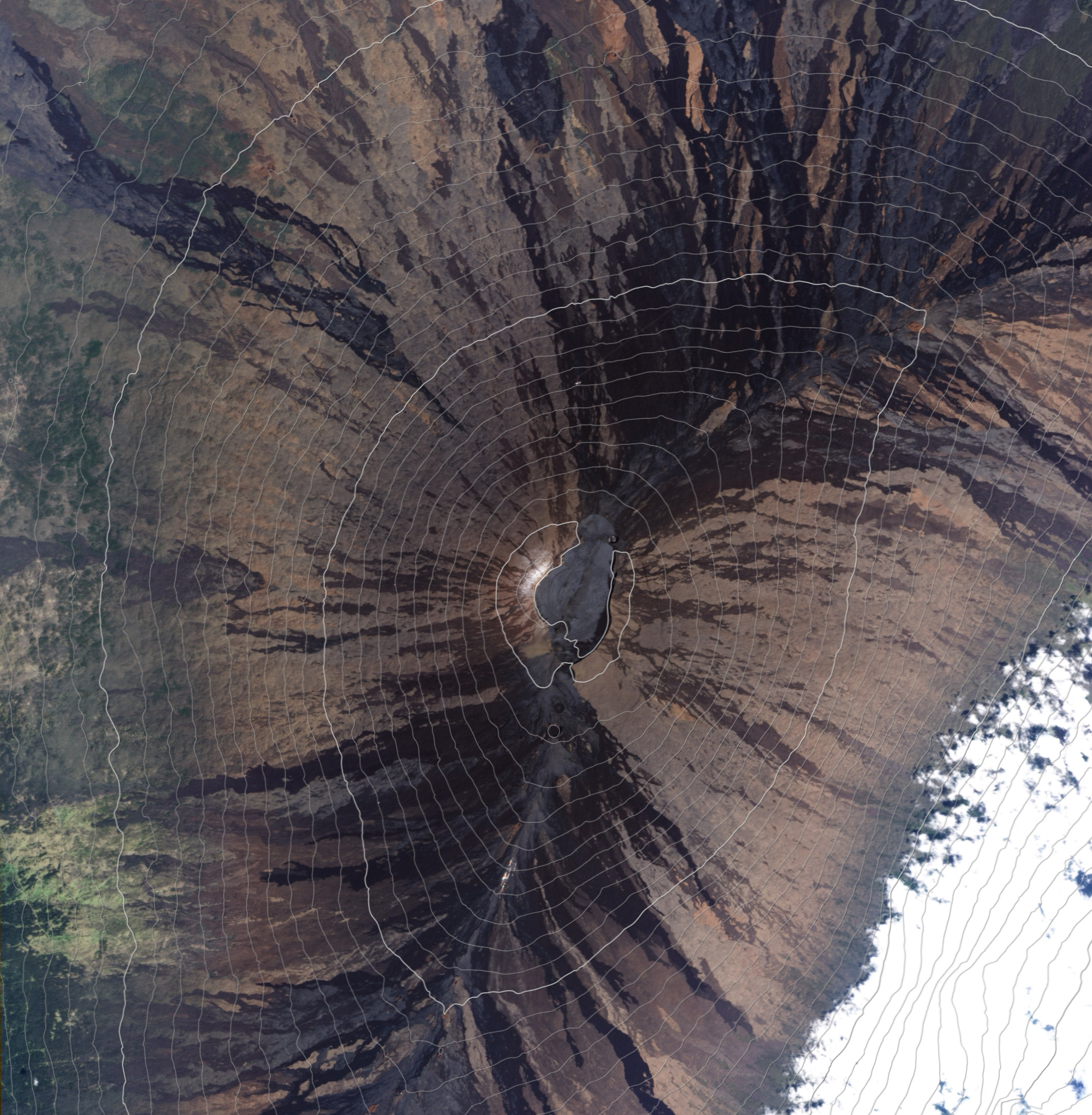
Satellite image of the summit of Mauna Loa overlaid with 100-meter (328 ft) contour lines.

Mauna Loa Observatory (MLO) is an atmospheric baseline station on Mauna Loa on the island of Hawaiʻi, located in the US state of Hawaii.

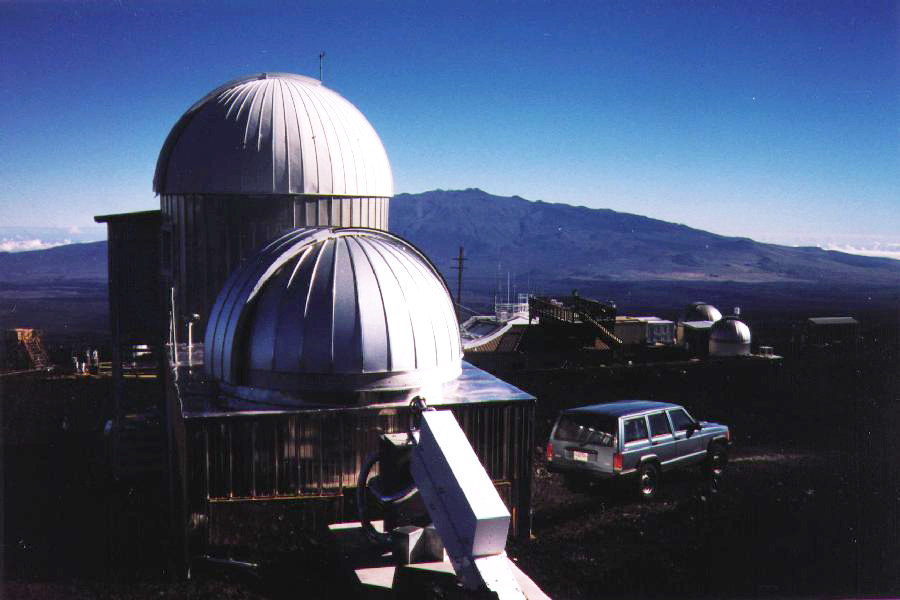
Two domes house solar sensors.

The Keeling Curve: Atmospheric CO_{2} concentrations as measured at MLO

== History ==
MLO was founded on June 28, 1956, as part of the US Weather Bureau. It was established on the northern flank of Mauna Loa at 3,394 meters (11,134 ft) after 1951–1954 efforts were unable to maintain a summit observatory at 4,100 meters (13,453 ft).

MLO was developed specifically to monitor solar, atmospheric, and meteorological parameters in the free atmosphere. The establishment of a solar constant, routine weather observations, the determination of ozone, and monitoring atmospheric circulation were early priorities. Continuous carbon dioxide measurements began in March of 1958 directed by Charles David Keeling from the Scripps Institute of Oceanography. The data set, referred to as the Keeling Curve, is the foundational study in the composition and behavior of greenhouse gases in the atmosphere. Other early research at the observatory included measurements of cosmic radiation, the atmosphere of Mars, atomic fallout, snow crystals, the solar corona, meteors, cosmic rays, and radio transmission. The International Geophysical Year enabled many of the early projects at the observatory to secure support and funding.

== The observatory ==
MLO has been part of the National Oceanic and Atmospheric Administration (NOAA) Global Monitoring Laboratory (GML)'s Baseline Observatory network since 1972. The observatory's location, far from continental sources of emissions and above the marine inversion layer, makes it an ideal site for atmospheric monitoring. The absence of continental weather patterns, lack of vegetation, and a predictable diurnal wind pattern provide routine access to clean, well-mixed air from the free troposphere.

The observatory's reading of a historic high in its daily recording of carbon dioxide emissions—400 parts per million, in 2015—was referenced by Pope Francis in his apostolic exhortation on the climate crisis, Laudate Deum.

== Cooperative research ==
In addition to NOAA-GML projects, the observatory campus remains host to projects from partner institutions, governmental organizations, and universities from around the world. The Mauna Loa Solar Observatory and National Science Foundation's Global Oscillations Network Group station share this site. The observatory site is also a temporary home to a cosmic microwave background observatory called Yuan-Tseh Lee Array.

== Site access ==
The observatory is located at the end of the Mauna Loa Observatory Access Road. Gated access to the observatory is managed by NOAA. The northern trailhead to the summit of Mauna Loa is located below the observatory site and is managed by Hawaiʻi Volcanoes National Park. It passes through State of Hawaii conservation land managed by the Hawaii Department of Land and Natural Resources.

The access road was obstructed by lava flow from the 2022 eruption of Mauna Loa. As of February 2023, deposits continue to block vehicular access to the observatory. Utility lines that powered the facility were also damaged, further impeding operation. Temporary solar power has been established, which allows the observatory to operate at approximately 33 percent of its full capacity. This is as renovations are underway to upgrade the facility with new power distribution infrastructure.

== See also ==
- Carbon dioxide in Earth's atmosphere
- Maunakea Observatories
