= Keeling Curve =

Graph of atmospheric CO2 from 1958 to the present

Steady rise of atmospheric carbon dioxide (CO_{2}) concentrations measured at Mauna Loa Observatory from 1958 to 2025

The Keeling Curve is a graph of the annual variation and overall accumulation of carbon dioxide in the Earth's atmosphere based on continuous measurements taken at the Mauna Loa Observatory on the island of Hawaii from 1958 to the present day. The curve is named for the scientist Charles David Keeling, who started the monitoring program and supervised it until his death in 2005.

Keeling's measurements showed the first significant evidence of rapidly increasing carbon dioxide (CO_{2}) levels in the atmosphere. According to Naomi Oreskes, Professor of History of Science at Harvard University, the Keeling Curve is one of the most important scientific works of the 20th century. Many scientists credit the Keeling Curve with first bringing the world's attention to the current increase of CO_{2} in the atmosphere.

== Background ==
Prior to the 1950s, measurements of atmospheric CO_{2} concentrations had been taken on an ad hoc basis at various locations. In 1938, engineer and amateur meteorologist Guy Stewart Callendar compared datasets of atmospheric CO_{2} from Kew in 1898–1901, which averaged 274 parts per million by volume (ppm), and from the eastern United States in 1936–1938, which averaged 310 ppm, and concluded that CO_{2} concentrations were rising due to anthropogenic emissions. However, Callendar's findings were not widely accepted by the scientific community due to the patchy nature of the measurements.

Charles David Keeling, of the Scripps Institution of Oceanography at UC San Diego, was the first person to make frequent regular measurements of atmospheric CO_{2} concentrations in Antarctica, and on Mauna Loa, Hawaii from March 1958 onwards. Keeling had previously tested and employed measurement techniques at locations including Big Sur near Monterey, rain forests of the Olympic Peninsula in Washington state, and high mountain forests in Arizona. He observed strong diurnal behavior of CO_{2}, with excess CO_{2} at night due to respiration by plants and soils, and afternoon values representative of the "free atmosphere" over the Northern Hemisphere.

== Mauna Loa measurements ==
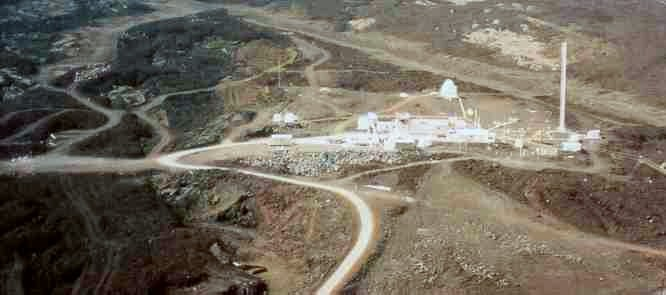
The Mauna Loa Observatory in Hawaii

In 1957–1958, the International Geophysical Year, Keeling obtained funding from the Weather Bureau to install infrared gas analyzers at remote locations, including the South Pole and on the volcano of Mauna Loa on the island of Hawaii. Mauna Loa was chosen as a long-term monitoring site due to its remote location far from continents and its lack of vegetation. Keeling and his collaborators measured the incoming ocean breeze above the thermal inversion layer to minimize local contamination from volcanic vents. The data was normalized to remove any influence from local contamination. Due to funding cuts in the mid-1960s, Keeling was forced to abandon continuous monitoring efforts at the South Pole, but he scraped together enough money to maintain operations at the Mauna Loa Observatory, which have continued to the present day.

External videos
- Scripps Institution of Oceanography at UC San Diego, The Keeling Curve Animation, Scripps Institution of Oceanography at UC San Diego
- Ralph Keeling, "The (Ralph) Keeling Curve", Scripps Institution of Oceanography at UC San Diego
- John Barnes, Mauna Loa Observatory I Exploratorium, Exploratorium
- Charles David Keeling, "The Keeling Curve Turns 50"
- Charles David Keeling, 2005 "Tyler Prize Laureate Lecture", Scripps Institution of Oceanography at UC San Diego

Keeling's Tellus article of 1960 presented the first monthly CO_{2} records from Mauna Loa and Antarctica (1957 to 1960), finding a "distinct seasonal cycle...and possibly, a worldwide rise in CO_{2} from year to year." By the 1970s, it was well established that the increase of atmospheric carbon dioxide was ongoing and due to anthropogenic emissions.

Carbon dioxide measurements at the Mauna Loa Observatory in Hawaii are made with a type of infrared spectrophotometer, now known as a nondispersive infrared sensor, that is calibrated using World Meteorological Organization standards. This type of instrument, originally called a capnograph, was first invented by John Tyndall in 1864, and recorded by pen traces on a strip chart recorder. Currently, several laser-based sensors are being added to run concurrently with the infrared spectrophotometer at the Scripps Institute of Oceanography, while NOAA measurements at Mauna Loa still use the nondispersive infrared sensor.

== Results and interpretation ==
The measurements collected at Mauna Loa Observatory show a steady increase in mean atmospheric CO_{2} concentration from 313 parts per million by volume (ppm) in March 1958 to 406 ppm in November 2018, with a current increase of 2.48 ± 0.26 (mean ± 2 std dev) ppm CO_{2} per year. This increase in atmospheric CO_{2} is due to the combustion of fossil fuels, and has been accelerating in recent years. Since CO_{2} is a greenhouse gas, this has significant implications for global warming. Measurements of CO_{2} concentration in ancient air bubbles trapped in polar ice cores show that mean atmospheric CO_{2} concentration was between 275 and 285 ppm during the Holocene epoch (9,000 BCE onwards), but started rising sharply at the beginning of the nineteenth century.

The Keeling Curve also shows a cyclic variation of about 6 ppm each year corresponding to the seasonal change in uptake of CO_{2} by the world's land vegetation. Most of this vegetation is in the Northern Hemisphere, where most of the land is located. From a maximum in May, the level decreases during the northern spring and summer as new plant growth takes CO_{2} out of the atmosphere through photosynthesis. After reaching a minimum in September, the level rises again in the northern fall and winter as plants and leaves die off and decay, releasing CO_{2} back into the atmosphere.

== Legacy ==
=== Global monitoring ===
Due in part to the significance of Keeling's findings, NOAA began monitoring CO_{2} levels worldwide in the 1970s. Today, atmospheric CO_{2} levels are monitored at about 100 sites around the globe through the Global Greenhouse Gas Reference Network. Measurements at many other isolated sites have confirmed the long-term trend shown by the Keeling curve, although no sites have as long a record as Mauna Loa.

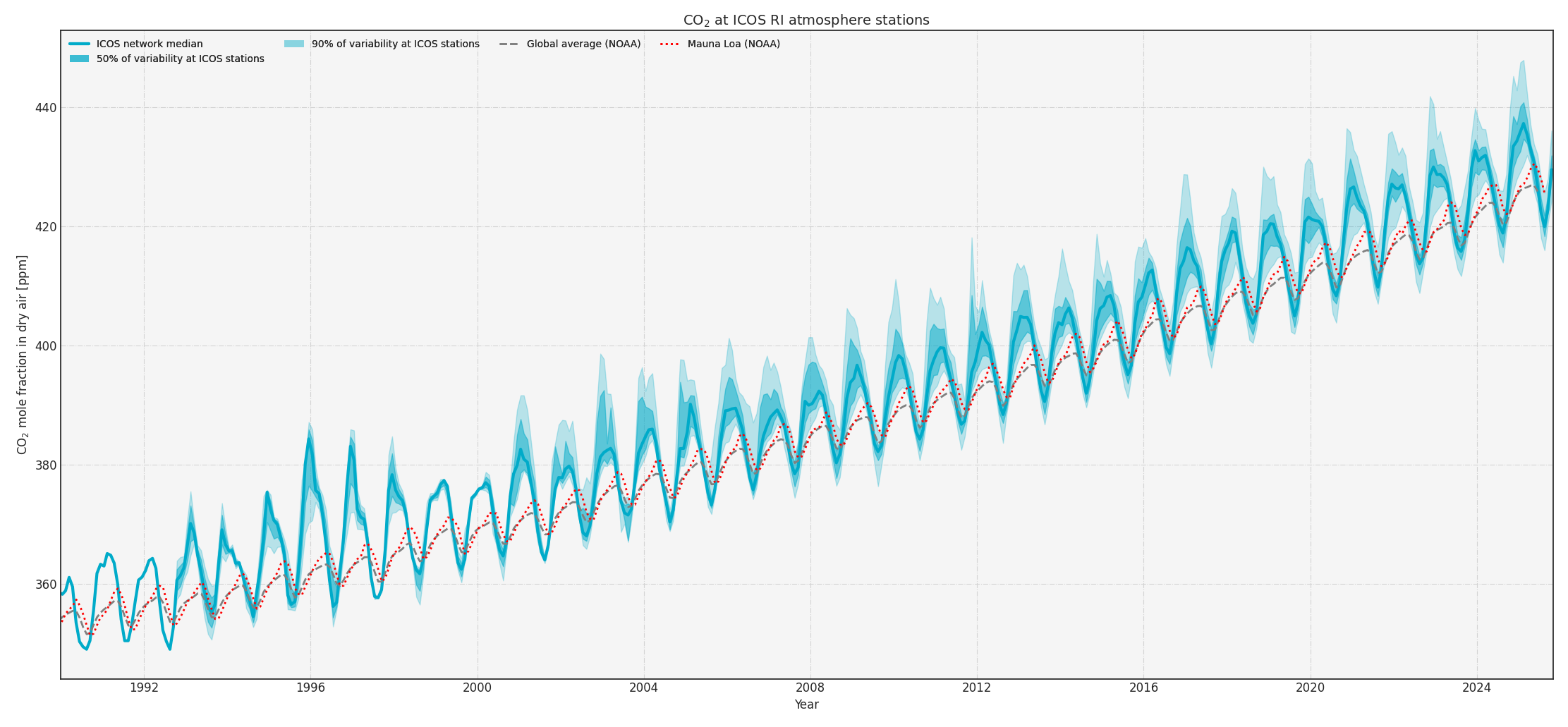
ICOS Curve showing the atmospheric CO_{2} levels in Europe from 1990 to 2025

==== ICOS Curve ====
The Integrated Carbon Observation System gathers data from 38 monitoring sites across Europe in a curve similar to the Keeling Curve. It is dubbed the "ICOS Curve". It shows an average CO_{2} concentration that is slightly higher than the global average, since Europe is densely populated and still emits high levels of CO_{2}.

=== Ralph Keeling ===
Since Charles David Keeling's death in 2005, responsibility and oversight of the project were transferred to Keeling's son, Ralph Keeling. On the fiftieth anniversary of the project's start, the younger Keeling wrote an article in Science magazine describing his father's life and work and how the project has grown and evolved over time. Along with more precise measurement materials and funds for the project of monitoring of the Earth's CO_{2} levels, Keeling wrote about his pride for his father's work and how he has continued it in his memory.

=== Recognition ===
In 2015, the Keeling Curve was designated a National Historic Chemical Landmark by the American Chemical Society. Commemorative plaques were installed at Mauna Loa Observatory and at the Scripps Institution of Oceanography at the University of California, San Diego.

=== Passing 400 ppm in 2013 ===
On May 9, 2013, the daily mean concentration of CO_{2} in the atmosphere measured at Mauna Loa surpassed 400 parts per million (ppm). Estimates of CO_{2} during previous geologic eras suggest that CO_{2} has not reached this level since the mid-Pliocene, 2 to 4 million years ago. This level of carbon dioxide, causing climate change, suggests a continued worsening in natural and ecological disasters, which increasingly threatens human and animal habitats on Earth, if greenhouse gas emissions are not significantly reduced.

== Keeling Plot ==
A Keeling Plot is a graphical representation of variations in δ^{13}C (carbon isotope ratios) (y-axis), plotted against the inverse of CO_{2} concentration (1/[CO_{2}]) (x-axis), used to identify sources and sinks of carbon within ecosystems, for paleoclimate studies, or for carbon cycle researches.

== See also ==
- Greenhouse gas monitoring
- Action for Climate Empowerment (ACE)
- Paris Agreement
