= Charles David Keeling =

American scientist (1928–2005)

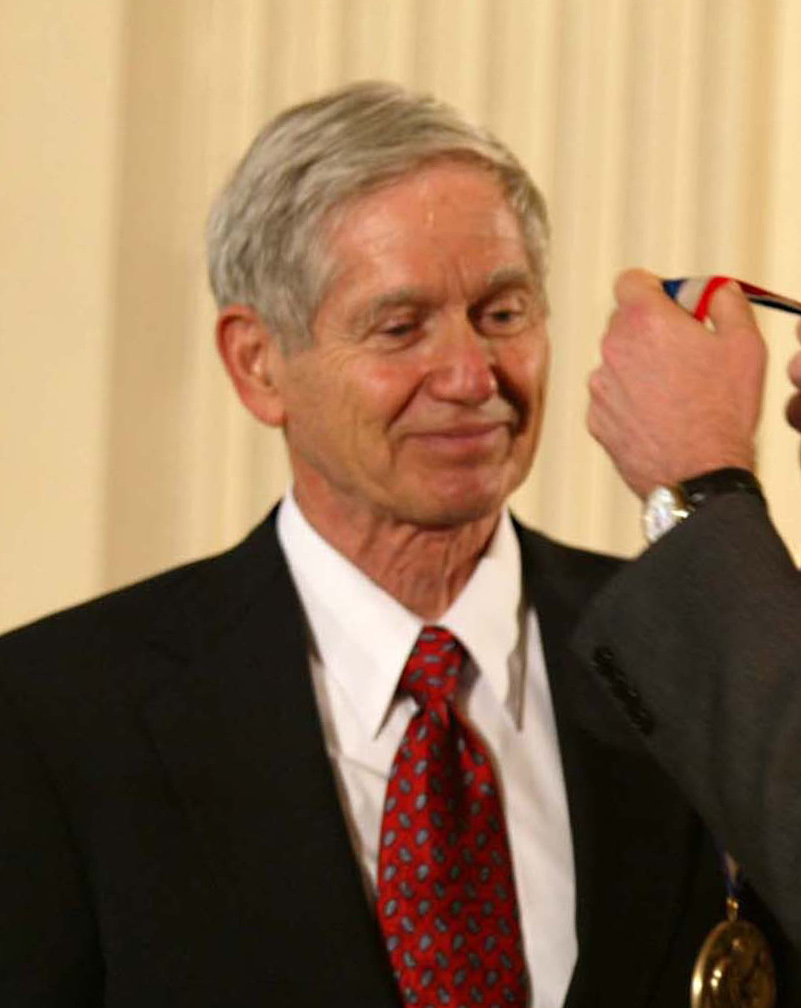
- Keeling receives the Medal of Science in 2001.
- Born: April 20, 1928; Scranton, Pennsylvania, U.S.
- Died: June 20, 2005 (aged 77); Hamilton, Montana, U.S.
- Education: University of Illinois; Northwestern University
- Known for: Keeling Curve
- Awards: Second Half Century Award, American Meteorological Society (1981); Maurice Ewing Medal (1991); Blue Planet Prize (1993); National Medal of Science (2002); Tyler Prize for Environmental Achievement (2005)
- Scientific career
- Fields: Atmosphere
- Workplaces: Scripps Institution of Oceanography
- Doctoral advisor: Malcolm Dole

Charles David Keeling (April 20, 1928 – June 20, 2005) was an American scientist whose recording of atmospheric carbon dioxide at the Mauna Loa Observatory confirmed Svante Arrhenius's proposition (1896) of the possibility of anthropogenic contribution to the greenhouse effect and global warming, by documenting the steadily rising carbon dioxide levels. The Keeling Curve measures the progressive buildup of carbon dioxide, a greenhouse gas, in the atmosphere.

== Early life and early career ==
Keeling was born in Scranton, Pennsylvania, to Ralph Keeling and Grace L Keeling (née Sherberne). His father, an investment banker, excited interests of astronomy in a 5-year-old Charles, while his mother instilled a lifelong love of music. He graduated with a degree in chemistry from the University of Illinois in 1948. Charles Keeling earned a PhD in chemistry from Northwestern University in 1953 under Malcolm Dole, a polymer chemist. Most of Dole's graduates were going straight into the oil industry; Keeling "had trouble seeing the future this way" and had become interested in geology, for which he had acquired most of the undergraduate coursework during his PhD. Keeling had applied for postdoctoral positions as a chemist almost exclusively to geology departments "west of the continental divide." He received an offer from Harrison Brown who had recently started a geochemistry department at California Institute of Technology. He was a postdoctoral fellow in geochemistry there until he joined the Scripps Institution of Oceanography in 1956, and was appointed professor of oceanography there in 1968.

At Caltech he developed the first instrument able to measure carbon dioxide in atmospheric samples with consistently reliable accuracy. Keeling camped at Big Sur where he used his new device to measure the level of carbon dioxide and found that it had risen since the 19th century.

== Work with the Scripps Institution of Oceanography, 1958–2005 ==
Atmospheric CO_{2} concentrations measured at Mauna Loa Observatory: The Keeling Curve.

Keeling worked at the Scripps Institution for 43 years during which time he published many influential papers. Roger Revelle, the director of the Scripps Institution of Oceanography, based at La Jolla, California, persuaded Keeling to continue his work there. Revelle was also one of the founders of the International Geophysical Year (IGY) in 1957–58 and Keeling received IGY funding to establish a base on Mauna Loa in Hawaii, two miles (3,000 m) above sea level.

Keeling started collecting carbon dioxide samples at the base in 1958. By 1960, he had established that there are strong seasonal variations in carbon dioxide levels with peak levels reached in the late northern hemisphere winter. A reduction in carbon dioxide followed during spring and early summer each year as plant growth increased in the land-rich northern hemisphere. In 1961, Keeling produced data showing that carbon dioxide levels were rising steadily in what later became known as the "Keeling Curve".

In the early 1960s, the National Science Foundation stopped supporting his research, calling the outcome "routine". Despite this lack of interest, the Foundation used Keeling's research in its warning in 1963 of rapidly increasing amounts of heat-trapping gases. A 1965 report from President Johnson's Science Advisory Committee similarly warned of the dangers of extra heat-trapping gases, which cause the temperature of the Earth to rise.

The data collection started by Keeling and continued at Mauna Loa is the longest continuous record of atmospheric carbon dioxide in the world and is considered a reliable indicator of the global trend in the mid-level troposphere. Keeling's research showed that the atmospheric concentration of carbon dioxide grew from 315 parts per million (ppm) in 1958 to 380 (ppm) in 2005, with increases correlated to fossil fuel emissions. There has also been an increase in seasonal variation in samples from the late 20th century and early 21st century.

== Personal life ==
Keeling was an enthusiastic outdoorsman who made many hiking and camping trips to the Western mountains, particularly the Cascade Mountains of Washington state. He was an active member of the Wilderness Society for much of his life.

Keeling married Louise Barthold in 1954. They had five children, one of whom (Ralph Keeling) followed in his father's footsteps and is a climate scientist at the Scripps Institution of Oceanography. Another one of his children, Eric Keeling, currently teaches biology at SUNY New Paltz. Charles Keeling was also an accomplished classical pianist who almost chose a career in music. Keeling was a founding director of the University of California San Diego Madrigal Singers. He was also general chairman of the citizens committee which drafted the Del Mar General Plan (or "Community Plan") in 1975.

Keeling died in 2005, aged 77, of a heart attack.

== Legacy ==
- At a White House ceremony held in July 1997, Keeling was presented with a "special achievement award" from Vice President Al Gore. Keeling was honored "for 40 years of outstanding scientific research associated with monitoring of atmospheric carbon dioxide in connection with Mauna Loa Observatory".
- The Keeling Curve is "engraved in bronze on a building at Mauna Loa and carved into a wall at the National Academy of Sciences in Washington." It was also a chart on the wall in a classroom at Harvard University where Revelle had moved to teach in the 1960s and where among others, student Al Gore would see and "marvel" at it. In 2006, Gore featured the graph in the book and movie An Inconvenient Truth.
- Charles David Keeling Memorial Lecture Series, Scripps Institution of Oceanography, since 2010.
- Keeling Lecture, University of Illinois, since 2010.
- The Charles David Keeling apartments at Revelle College of the University of California San Diego, opened in 2011, were designed to emphasize environmental awareness and minimize ecological impact.
- Dr Keeling's Curve (2014), one-man play written by George Shea and performed by Mike Farrell.
- The Keeling Curve Prize. Multiple awards presented annually by the Global Warming Mitigation Project since 2018.
- On August 11, 2025, the minor planet 2005 CO_{2} was named 284054 Keeling in his honor.

== Memberships/fellowships ==
Keeling was a Guggenheim fellow at the Meteorological Institute, Stockholm University (1961–62); a guest professor at the Second Physical Institute of the University of Heidelberg (1969–70) and the Physical Institute of the University of Bern (1979–80).

He was a fellow of the American Academy of Arts and Sciences, the American Geophysical Union, and the American Association for the Advancement of Science, and a member of the National Academy of Sciences.

He was a member of the commission on global pollution of the International Association of Meteorology, and scientific director of the Central CO_{2} Calibration Laboratory of the World Meteorological Organization.

== Selected publications ==
- Keeling, Charles D. (1958). "The Concentration and Isotopic Abundances of Carbon Dioxide in Rural Areas". Geochimica et Cosmochimica Acta. 13: 322–334. doi:10.1016/0016-7037(61)90023-0.
- Pales, Jack C.; Keeling, Charles David (1965). "The Concentration of Atmospheric Carbon Dioxide in Hawaii". Journal of Geophysical Research. 70 (24): 6053–6076. Bibcode:1965JGR....70.6053P. doi:10.1029/JZ070i024p06053.
- Keeling, Charles D. (1970). "Is Carbon Dioxide from Fossil Fuel Changing Man's Environment?". Proceedings of the American Philosophical Society. 114 (1): 10–17. JSTOR 985720.

== See also ==
- Carbon dioxide in Earth's atmosphere
- List of climate scientists
