= Radiative-convective equilibrium =

Meteorological concept

The radiative-convective equilibrium (RCE) is a concept for the radiative balance of the atmosphere. It describes the balance between the net radiative longwave cooling and the heating due to convection and surface fluxes. The main difference to the pure radiative equilibrium is that the lapse rate in the troposphere is adjusted to a more realistic one.

In climate models, the concept is used to simulate the globally averaged thermal structure of the atmosphere and offers the opportunity to analyse the sensitivity of this structure to CO_{2}. Syukuro Manabe won the Physics Nobel Prize for his RCE model as it was the first to produce a realistic estimate of the Earth's Climate Sensitivity (ECS). On Earth, the tropical atmosphere is on many scales close to RCE. Therefore, the concept has also been used for studying tropical circulation and different aspects of moist convection

The concept has its limitations in cases of a very stable atmosphere which nearly eliminates convection.

== Concept ==
Most of the atmospheric heating is done by the Earth's surface as the atmosphere is transparent to solar radiation in most parts of the spectrum. Considering only pure radiative equilibrium, the layer close to the surface heats strongly and becomes unstable. To balance this instability, atmospheric motions, like convective updrafts, transport the heat upward in the atmosphere creating a new equilibrium that can be seen in the figure. Therefore, the surface and troposphere are strongly coupled and must be considered as a unit. This strong coupling is taken into account in the RCE with a "convective adjustment". This is done by adjusting the lapse rate to the moist adiabatic one (Γ = 6.5 K km ^{−1} ) as soon as the layer becomes more unstable than this value. This adjustment eliminates some of the unrealistic features of a pure radiative equilibrium atmosphere, like a very warm Earth's surface (332.3 K), and results in a more realistic value (300.3 K). The strong coupling between the surface and the troposphere implies that the energy balance at the top of the atmosphere rather than the balance at the surface is critical for the analysis of climate sensitivity.

=== Equations for a single-layer atmosphere ===
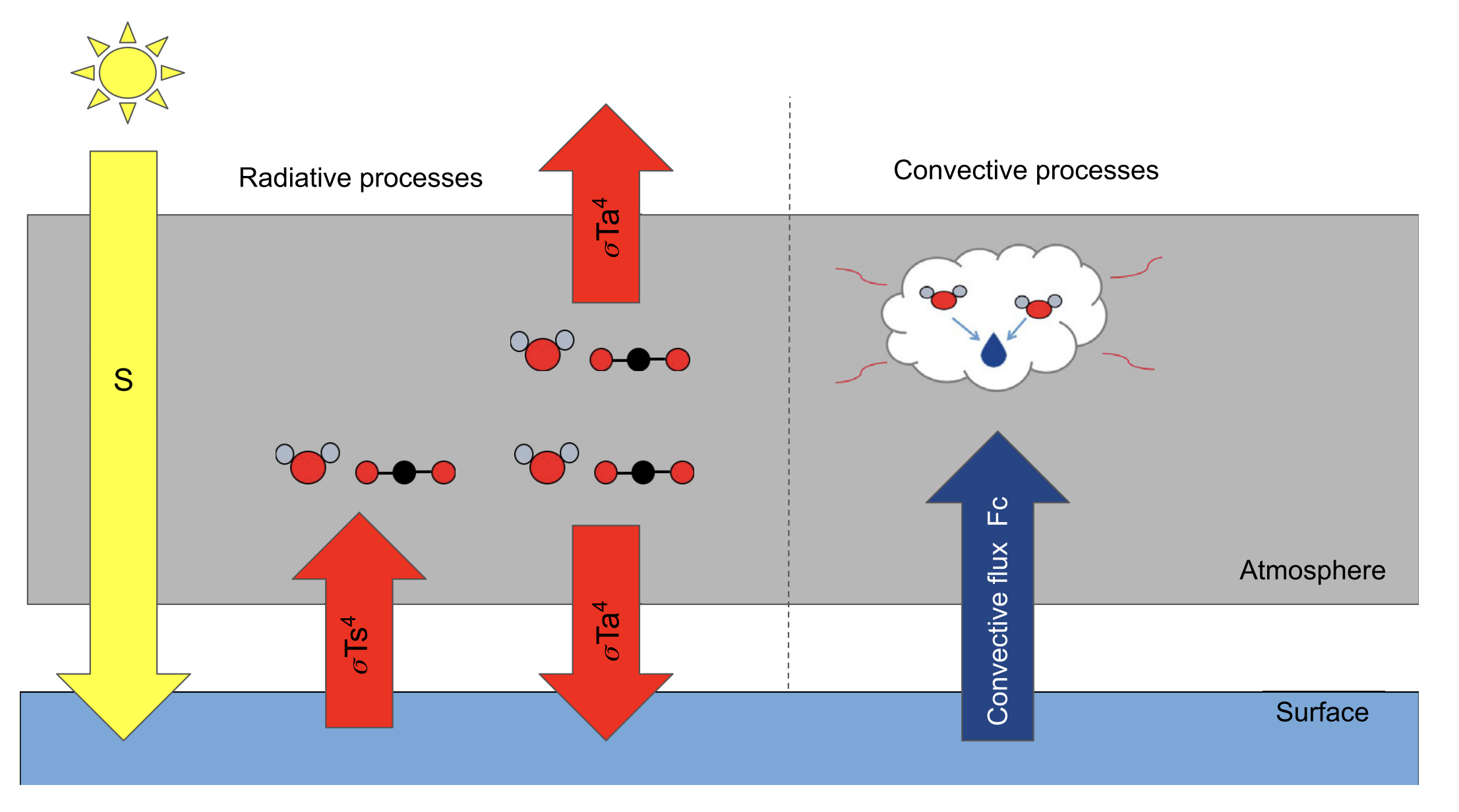
A cartoon of radiative-convective equilibrium. See the text for explanation.

According to the figure, the energy budget at the top of the atmosphere reads

(S_{0} (1-α))/4 = σT_{a}^{4}

and at the surface

(S_{0} (1-α))/4 + σT_{a}^{4} = σT_{s}^{4} + F_{c}

- S_{0}: Solar constant
- α: Albedo
- σ: Stefan–Boltzmann constant
- T_{a}: Atmospheric temperature
- T_{s}: Surface temperature
- F_{c}: Convective flux

At the top of the atmosphere, the equations depict the balance between incoming solar radiation that is not reflected by the surface or in an atmospheric layer and outgoing longwave radiation, which depends on the atmosphere's temperature. At the surface, in addition to incoming solar radiation, there is also radiation received from the atmosphere above. These components of the equations align with those of pure radiative equilibrium. However, the equations for RCE also incorporate a convective flux, F_{c}, that partially balances the surface fluxes. This flux represents the "convective adjustment" described earlier.

== Applications ==
The RCE is a very simple yet valid description of the climate system. From observations, it is known that especially the tropical atmosphere is close to RCE on larger scales down to daily time scales when considering the tropics as a whole. Due to its simplicity and realism, the RCE concept is widely used for modelling. The most famous application of RCE was done by Manabe and Wetherland in 1967 where they developed a one-dimensional model to provide the first realistic estimate of the ECS (2.3 °C). Syukuro Manabe was awarded with the Nobel Prize in Physics in 2021 for this key finding

As greater computational resources became available, the application of the RCE concept evolved from the one-dimensional models of Manabe and Wetherland to cloud-resolving and general circulation models. Today, the concept is used to investigate various aspects of tropical convection and circulation, including the predictability of mesoscale rainfall, tropical anvil clouds, precipitation extremes, aerosol-cloud interactions, convective organization and land surface influences on the climate state. Cloud feedbacks are also examined using RCE, and it has been found that in particular tropical cloud feedbacks are well-captured in RCE. Moreover, RCE has also been used as a background state for tropical cyclone studies as well as for simulating the globally averaged thermal structure of the atmosphere in climate models

== Limitations ==
The concept has its limitations in cases of a very stable atmosphere which nearly eliminates convection. In this case, the surface is decoupled from the region of atmospheric absorption. Examples of this are high-latitude winters and tropical ocean regions with upwelling of cold waters
