= Thermodynamic operation =

Externally imposed manipulation that affects a thermodynamic system

A thermodynamic operation refers to any external manipulation impacting a thermodynamic system. This can involve alterations to the system's boundary with its surroundings or changes in the values of variables within those surroundings that interact with the system's boundary, facilitating the transfer of extensive quantities associated with those variables. In thermodynamics, it is assumed that such operations occur without consideration of relevant microscopic details.

A thermodynamic operation requires a contribution from an independent external agency, that does not come from the passive properties of the systems. Perhaps the first expression of the distinction between a thermodynamic operation and a thermodynamic process is in Kelvin's statement of the second law of thermodynamics: "It is impossible, by means of inanimate material agency, to derive mechanical effect from any portion of matter by cooling it below the temperature of the surrounding objects." A sequence of events that occurred other than "by means of inanimate material agency" would entail an action by an animate agency, or at least an independent external agency. Such an agency could impose some thermodynamic operations. For example, those operations might create a heat pump, which of course would comply with the second law. A Maxwell's demon conducts an extremely idealized and naturally unrealizable kind of thermodynamic operation.

Another commonly used term that indicates a thermodynamic operation is 'change of constraint', for example referring to the removal of a wall between two otherwise isolated compartments.

An ordinary language expression for a thermodynamic operation is used by Edward A. Guggenheim: "tampering" with the bodies.

== Distinction between thermodynamic operation and thermodynamic process ==
A typical thermodynamic operation is externally imposed change of position of a piston, so as to alter the volume of the system of interest. Another thermodynamic operation is a removal of an initially separating wall, a manipulation that unites two systems into one undivided system. A typical thermodynamic process consists of a redistribution that spreads a conserved quantity between a system and its surroundings across a previously impermeable but newly semi-permeable wall between them.

More generally, a process can be considered as a transfer of some quantity that is defined by a change of an extensive state variable of the system, corresponding to a conserved quantity, so that a transfer balance equation can be written. According to Uffink, "... thermodynamic processes only take place after an external intervention on the system (such as: removing a partition, establishing thermal contact with a heat bath, pushing a piston, etc.). They do not correspond to the autonomous behaviour of a free system." For example, for a closed system of interest, a change of internal energy (an extensive state variable of the system) can be occasioned by transfer of energy as heat. In thermodynamics, heat is not an extensive state variable of the system. The quantity of heat transferred, is however, defined by the amount of adiabatic work that would produce the same change of the internal energy as the heat transfer; energy transferred as heat is the conserved quantity.

As a matter of history, the distinction, between a thermodynamic operation and a thermodynamic process, is not found in these terms in nineteenth century accounts. For example, Kelvin spoke of a "thermodynamic operation" when he meant what present-day terminology calls a thermodynamic operation followed by a thermodynamic process. Again, Planck usually spoke of a "process" when our present-day terminology would speak of a thermodynamic operation followed by a thermodynamic process.

=== Planck's "natural processes" contrasted with actions of Maxwell's demon ===
Planck held that all "natural processes" (meaning, in present-day terminology, a thermodynamic operation followed by a thermodynamic process) are irreversible and proceed in the sense of increase of entropy sum. In these terms, it would be by thermodynamic operations that, if he could exist, Maxwell's demon would conduct unnatural affairs, which include transitions in the sense away from thermodynamic equilibrium. They are physically theoretically conceivable up to a point, but are not natural processes in Planck's sense. The reason is that ordinary thermodynamic operations are conducted in total ignorance of the very kinds of microscopic information that is essential to the efforts of Maxwell's demon.

== Examples of thermodynamic operations ==
=== Thermodynamic cycle ===
A thermodynamic cycle is constructed as a sequence of stages or steps. Each stage consists of a thermodynamic operation followed by a thermodynamic process. For example, an initial thermodynamic operation of a cycle of a Carnot heat engine could be taken as the setting of the working body, at a known high temperature, into contact with a thermal reservoir at the same temperature (the hot reservoir), through a wall permeable only to heat, while it remains in mechanical contact with the work reservoir. This thermodynamic operation is followed by a thermodynamic process, in which the expansion of the working body is so slow as to be effectively reversible, while internal energy is transferred as heat from the hot reservoir to the working body and as work from the working body to the work reservoir. Theoretically, the process terminates eventually, and this ends the stage. The engine is then subject to another thermodynamic operation, and the cycle proceeds into another stage. The cycle completes when the thermodynamic variables (the thermodynamic state) of the working body return to their initial values.

=== Virtual thermodynamic operations ===
A refrigeration device passes a working substance through successive stages, overall constituting a cycle. This may be brought about not by moving or changing separating walls around an unmoving body of working substance, but rather by moving a body of working substance to bring about exposure to a cyclic succession of unmoving unchanging walls. The effect is virtually a cycle of thermodynamic operations. The kinetic energy of bulk motion of the working substance is not a significant feature of the device, and the working substance may be practically considered as nearly at rest.

=== Composition of systems ===
For many chains of reasoning in thermodynamics, it is convenient to think of the combination of two systems into one. It is imagined that the two systems, separated from their surroundings, are juxtaposed and (by a shift of viewpoint) regarded as constituting a new, composite system. The composite system is imagined amid its new overall surroundings. This sets up the possibility of interaction between the two subsystems and between the composite system and its overall surroundings, for example by allowing contact through a wall with a particular kind of permeability. This conceptual device was introduced into thermodynamics mainly in the work of Carathéodory, and has been widely used since then.

=== Additivity of extensive variables ===
If the thermodynamic operation is entire removal of walls, then extensive state variables of the composed system are the respective sums of those of the component systems. This is called the additivity of extensive variables.

=== Scaling of a system ===
A thermodynamic system consisting of a single phase, in the absence of external forces, in its own state of internal thermodynamic equilibrium, is homogeneous. This means that the material in any region of the system can be interchanged with the material of any congruent and parallel region of the system, and the effect is to leave the system thermodynamically unchanged. The thermodynamic operation of scaling is the creation of a new homogeneous system whose size is a multiple of the old size, and whose intensive variables have the same values. Traditionally the size is stated by the mass of the system, but sometimes it is stated by the entropy, or by the volume. For a given such system Φ, scaled by the real number λ to yield a new one λΦ, a state function, X(.), such that X(λΦ) = λ X(Φ), is said to be extensive. Such a function as X is called a homogeneous function of degree 1. There are two different concepts mentioned here, sharing the same name: (a) the mathematical concept of degree-1 homogeneity in the scaling function; and (b) the physical concept of the spatial homogeneity of the system. It happens that the two agree here, but that is not because they are tautologous. It is a contingent fact of thermodynamics.

=== Splitting and recomposition of systems ===
If two systems, S_{a} and S_{b} , have identical intensive variables, a thermodynamic operation of wall removal can compose them into a single system, S, with the same intensive variables. If, for example, their internal energies are in the ratio λ:(1−λ), then the composed system, S, has internal energy in the ratio of 1:λ to that of the system S_{a}. By the inverse thermodynamic operation, the system S can be split into two subsystems in the obvious way. As usual, these thermodynamic operations are conducted in total ignorance of the microscopic states of the systems. More particularly, it is characteristic of macroscopic thermodynamics that the probability vanishes, that the splitting operation occurs at an instant when system S is in the kind of extreme transient microscopic state envisaged by the Poincaré recurrence argument. Such splitting and recomposition is in accord with the above defined additivity of extensive variables.

== Statements of laws ==
Thermodynamic operations appear in the statements of the laws of thermodynamics. For the zeroth law, one considers operations of thermally connecting and disconnecting systems. For the second law, some statements contemplate an operation of connecting two initially unconnected systems. For the third law, one statement is that no finite sequence of thermodynamic operations can bring a system to absolute zero temperature.

== Bibliography for citations ==
- Bailyn, M. (1994). A Survey of Thermodynamics, American Institute of Physics Press, New York, ISBN 0-88318-797-3.
- Callen, H.B. (1960/1985). Thermodynamics and an Introduction to Thermostatistics, (1st edition 1960) 2nd edition 1985, Wiley, New York, ISBN 0-471-86256-8.
- Carathéorory, C. (1909). "Untersuchungen über die Grundlagen der Thermodynamik". Mathematische Annalen. 67 (3): 355–386. doi:10.1007/BF01450409. S2CID 118230148. A translation may be found here. Also a mostly reliable translation is to be found at Kestin, J. (1976). The Second Law of Thermodynamics, Dowden, Hutchinson & Ross, Stroudsburg PA..
- Giles, R. (1964). Mathematical Foundations of Thermodynamics, Macmillan, New York.
- Guggenheim, E.A. (1949/1967). Thermodynamics. An Advanced Treatment for Chemists and Physicists, fifth revised edition, North-Holland, Amsterdam.
- Guggenheim, E.A. (1949). 'Statistical basis of thermodynamics', Research, 2: 450–454.
- Gyarmati, I. (1967/1970). Non-equilibrium Thermodynamics. Field Theory and Variational Principles, translated from the 1967 Hungarian by E. Gyarmati and W.F. Heinz, Springer-Verlag, New York.
- Haase, R. (1971). Survey of Fundamental Laws, chapter 1 of Thermodynamics, pages 1–97 of volume 1, ed. W. Jost, of Physical Chemistry. An Advanced Treatise, ed. H. Eyring, D. Henderson, W. Jost, Academic Press, New York, lcn 73–117081.
- Kelvin, Lord (1857). On the alteration of temperature accompanying changes of pressure in fluids, Proc. Roy. Soc., June.
- Landsberg, P.T. (1961). Thermodynamics with Quantum Statistical Illustrations, Interscience, New York.
- Lieb, E.H., Yngvason, J. (1999). The physics and mathematics of the second law of thermodynamics, Physics Reports, 314: 1–96, p. 14.
- Planck, M. (1887). 'Ueber das Princip der Vermehrung der Entropie', Annalen der Physik und Chemie, new series 30: 562–582.
- Planck, M., (1897/1903). Treatise on Thermodynamics, translated by A. Ogg, Longmans, Green, & Co., London.
- Planck, M. (1935). Bemerkungen über Quantitätsparameter, Intenstitätsparameter und stabiles Gleichgewicht, Physica, 2: 1029–1032.
- Tisza, L. (1966). Generalized Thermodynamics, M.I.T Press, Cambridge MA.
- Uffink, J. (2001). Bluff your way in the second law of thermodynamics, Stud. Hist. Phil. Mod. Phys., 32(3): 305–394, publisher Elsevier Science.
