= Thermal Equilibrium of the Atmosphere with a Given Distribution of Relative Humidity =

1967 influential scientific article on climate

"Thermal Equilibrium of the Atmosphere with a Given Distribution of Relative Humidity" is a scientific article published by Syukuro Manabe and Richard Wetherald (Geophysical Fluid Dynamics Laboratory) in 1967 in Journal of the Atmospheric Sciences, dedicated to climate modelling. It is often considered to be the most influential paper in history of climate change science: the climate model that it describes is indeed the first one to address the main physical mechanisms that determine the influence of carbon dioxide (CO_{2}) on Earth surface temperature through the greenhouse effect.

Manabe and Wetherald's one-dimension climate radiative-convective model includes an accurate spectroscopy of CO_{2}, ozone and water vapor, atmospheric convection, and water vapor feedback. When a doubled CO_{2} atmospheric concentration is given as an input to the model, it provides a temperature shift (equilibrium climate sensitivity) of +2.4 °C, which is consistent with modern estimates, such as those published in the IPCC Sixth Assessment Report.

The "Summary and Conclusions" 4. reads exactly as: "Doubling the existing CO2 content of the atmosphere has the effect of increasing the surface temperature by about 2.3C for the atmosphere with the realistic distribution of relative humidity and by about 1.3C for that with the realistic distribution of absolute humidity."
