= Syukuro Manabe =

Japanese–American meteorologist and climatologist

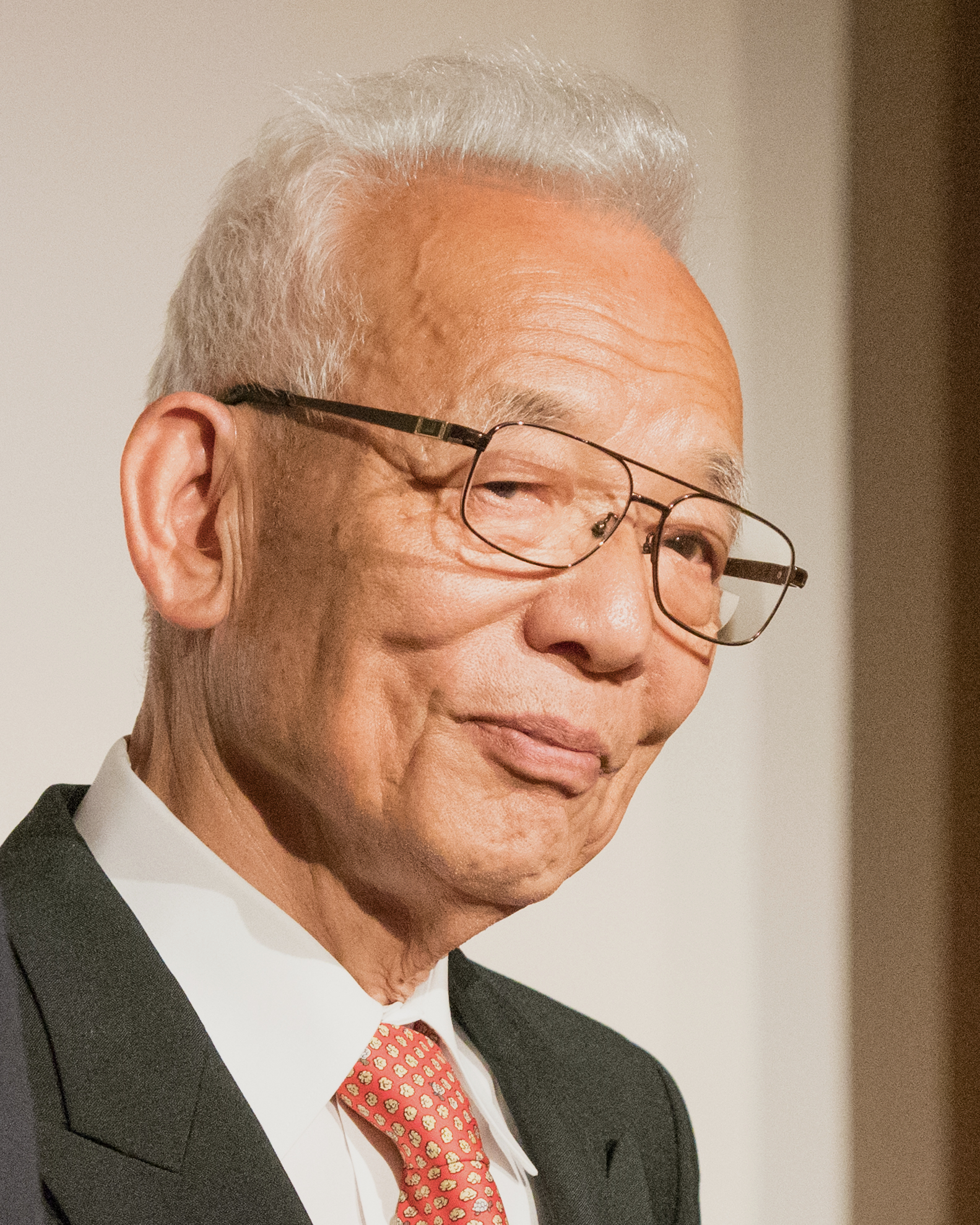
- Manabe in 2018
- Born: 21 September 1931 (age 95); Shinritsu, Uma, Ehime, Japan
- Education: University of Tokyo (BA, MA, DSc)
- Occupation: Meteorologist
- Awards: Carl-Gustaf Rossby Research Medal (1992); Blue Planet Prize (1992); Roger Revelle Medal (1993); Asahi Prize (1995); Volvo Environment Prize (1997); William Bowie Medal (2010); Franklin Institute Awards (2015); Crafoord Prize (2018); Nobel Prize in Physics (2021)
- Scientific career
- Fields: Meteorology, climatology, climate change, computer simulation
- Workplaces: Princeton University; Nagoya University
- Doctoral students: Isaac Held, Kenneth Bowman, Alex Hall

Syukuro "Suki" Manabe (真鍋 淑郎, Manabe Shukurō; born 21 September 1931) is a Japanese–American physicist, meteorologist, and climatologist, who pioneered the use of computers to simulate global climate change and natural climate variations. He was awarded the 2021 Nobel Prize in Physics jointly with Klaus Hasselmann and Giorgio Parisi, for his contributions to the physical modeling of Earth's climate, quantifying its variability, and predictions of climate change.

== Early life and education ==
Born in 1931 in Shinritsu Village, Uma District, Ehime Prefecture, Japan. Both his grandfather and his father were physicians, who operated the only clinic in the village. A classmate recalled that, even in elementary school, he was already "interested in the weather, making comments such as 'If Japan didn't have typhoons, we wouldn't have so much rain.'" Manabe attended Ehime Prefectural Mishima High School. When he was accepted into the University of Tokyo, his family expected him to study medicine, but "whenever there's an emergency, the blood rushes to my head, so I would not have made a good doctor." Furthermore, "I had a horrible memory and I was clumsy with my hands. I thought that my only good trait was to gaze at the sky and get lost in my thoughts." He joined the research team of Shigekata Shono (1911–1969), and majored in meteorology. Manabe received a BA degree in 1953, an MA degree in 1955, and a DSc degree in 1958, all from the University of Tokyo.

== Career ==
After finishing his doctorate, Manabe went to the United States to work at the General Circulation Research Section of the U.S. Weather Bureau, now the Geophysical Fluid Dynamics Laboratory of NOAA, continuing until 1997. From 1997 to 2001, he worked at the Frontier Research System for Global Change in Japan serving as Director of the Global Warming Research Division. In 2002 he returned to the United States as a visiting research collaborator at the Program in Atmospheric and Oceanic Science, Princeton University. He currently serves as senior meteorologist at the university. He also engaged as a specially invited professor at Nagoya University from December 2007 to March 2014.

== Scientific accomplishments ==
Working at NOAA's Geophysical Fluid Dynamics Laboratory, first in Washington, DC and later in Princeton, New Jersey, Manabe worked with director Joseph Smagorinsky to develop three-dimensional models of the atmosphere. As the first step, Manabe and Wetherald (1967) developed a one-dimensional, single-column model of the atmosphere in radiative-convective equilibrium with positive feedback effect of water vapor. Using the model, they found that, in response to the change in atmospheric concentration of carbon dioxide, the temperature increases at the Earth's surface and in the troposphere, whereas it decreases in the stratosphere.

The development of the radiative-convective model was a critically important step towards the development of comprehensive general circulation model of the atmosphere (Manabe et al. 1965). They used the model to simulate for the first time the three-dimensional response of temperature and the hydrologic cycle to increased carbon dioxide (Manabe and Wetherald, 1975). In 1969, Manabe and Bryan published the first simulations of the climate by a coupled ocean-atmosphere models, in which the general circulation model of the atmosphere is combined with that of ocean.

Throughout the 1990s and early 2000s, Manabe's research group published seminal papers using the coupled atmosphere ocean models to investigate the time-dependent response of climate to changing greenhouse gas concentrations of the atmosphere (Stouffer et al., 1989; Manabe et al., 1991 & 1992). They also applied the model to the study of past climate change, including the role of freshwater input to the North Atlantic Ocean as a potential cause of the so-called, abrupt climate change evident in the paleoclimatic record (Manabe and Stouffer, 1995 & 2000).

For further details, see Selected publications.

== Awards and honors ==
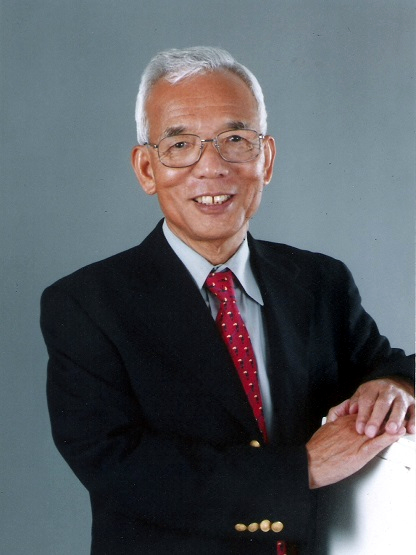
Portrait of Manabe (released by the Ministry of Education, Culture, Sports, Science and Technology when Manabe received the Order of Culture)

Manabe is a member of the United States National Academy of Sciences, and a foreign member of Japan Academy, Academia Europaea and the Royal Society of Canada.

In 1992, Manabe was the first recipient of the Blue Planet Prize of the Asahi Glass Foundation. In 1995, he received the Asahi Prize from Asahi News-Cultural Foundation. In 1997 Manabe was awarded the Volvo Environmental Prize from the Volvo Foundation. In 2015 he was awarded the Benjamin Franklin Medal of Franklin Institute.

Manabe has also been honored with the American Meteorological Society's Carl-Gustaf Rossby Research Medal, the Second Half Century Award, and the Clarence Leroy Meisinger Award. In addition, he is honored with the American Geophysical Union's William Bowie Medal and Revelle Medal, and in 1998 received the Milutin Milankovic Medal from the European Geophysical Society.

Manabe and Bryan's work in the development of the first global climate models has been selected as one of the Top Ten Breakthroughs to have occurred in NOAA's first 200 years. In honor of his retirement from NOAA / GFDL, a three-day scientific meeting was held in Princeton, New Jersey in March 1998. "Understanding Climate Change: A Symposium in honor of Syukuro Manabe". The 2005 annual meeting of American Meteorological Society included a special Suki Manabe Symposium.

Jointly with climatologist James Hansen, Manabe received the BBVA Foundation Frontiers of Knowledge Award in the Climate Change category in the ninth edition (2016) of the awards. The two laureates were separately responsible for constructing the first computational models with the power to simulate climate behavior. Decades ago, they correctly predicted how much Earth's temperature would rise due to increasing atmospheric CO_{2}. The scores of models currently in use to chart climate evolution are heirs to those developed by Manabe and Hansen.

In 2018, Manabe received the Crafoord Prize in Geosciences jointly with Susan Solomon "for fundamental contributions to understanding the role of atmospheric trace gases in Earth's climate system".

In 2021, he received the Order of Culture.

In 2022, Manabe was named by Carnegie Corporation of New York as an honoree of the Great Immigrants Awards.

=== The Nobel Prize ===
In 2021, one half of the Nobel Prize in Physics was shared between Manabe and Klaus Hasselmann "for the physical modeling of Earth's climate, quantifying variability and reliably predicting global warming". Shuji Nakamura, the 2014 Nobel Prize in Physics awardee who also came from Ehime Prefecture and immigrated to the United States, congratulated Manabe on 6 October.

== Selected publications ==
- Manabe, Syukuro; Smagorinsky, Joseph; Strickler, Robert F. (1965). "Simulated climatology of a general circulation model with a hydrologic cycle". Monthly Weather Review. 93 (12). American Meteorological Society: 769–798. Bibcode:1965MWRv...93..769M. doi:10.1175/1520-0493(1965)093<0769:scoagc>2.3.co;2. ISSN 0027-0644.
- Manabe, Syukuro; Wetherald, Richard T. (1967). "Thermal Equilibrium of the Atmosphere with a Given Distribution of Relative Humidity". Journal of the Atmospheric Sciences. 24 (3). American Meteorological Society: 241–259. Bibcode:1967JAtS...24..241M. doi:10.1175/1520-0469(1967)024<0241:teotaw>2.0.co;2. ISSN 0022-4928.
- Manabe, Syukuro; Bryan, Kirk (1969). "Climate Calculations with a Combined Ocean-Atmosphere Model". Journal of the Atmospheric Sciences. 26 (4). American Meteorological Society: 786–789. Bibcode:1969JAtS...26..786M. doi:10.1175/1520-0469(1969)026<0786:ccwaco>2.0.co;2. ISSN 0022-4928.
- Manabe, Syukuro; Wetherald, Richard T. (1975). "The Effects of Doubling the CO2Concentration on the climate of a General Circulation Model". Journal of the Atmospheric Sciences. 32 (1). American Meteorological Society: 3–15. Bibcode:1975JAtS...32....3M. doi:10.1175/1520-0469(1975)032<0003:TEODTC>2.0.CO;2. ISSN 0022-4928.
- Manabe, Syukuro; Stouffer, Ronald (1980). "Sensitivity of a global climate model to an increase of CO2 concentration in the atmosphere". Journal of Geophysical Research: Oceans. 85 (C10). American Geophysical Society: 5529–5554. Bibcode:1975JAtS...32....3M. doi:10.1029/JC085iC10p05529. ISSN 0022-4928.
- Stouffer, R. J.; Manabe, S.; Bryan, K. (1989). "Interhemispheric asymmetry in climate response to a gradual increase of atmospheric CO_{2}". Nature. 342 (6250). Springer: 660–662. Bibcode:1989Natur.342..660S. doi:10.1038/342660a0. ISSN 0028-0836. S2CID 4251851.
- Manabe, S.; Stouffer, R. J.; Spelman, M. J.; Bryan, K. (1991). "Transient Responses of a Coupled Ocean–Atmosphere Model to Gradual Changes of Atmospheric CO_{2}. Part I. Annual Mean Response". Journal of Climate. 4 (8). American Meteorological Society: 785–818. Bibcode:1991JCli....4..785M. doi:10.1175/1520-0442(1991)004<0785:troaco>2.0.co;2. ISSN 0894-8755.
- Manabe, S.; Spelman, M. J.; Stouffer, R. J. (1992). "Transient Responses of a Coupled Ocean-Atmosphere Model to Gradual Changes of Atmospheric CO_{2}. Part II: Seasonal Response". Journal of Climate. 5 (2). American Meteorological Society: 105–126. Bibcode:1992JCli....5..105M. doi:10.1175/1520-0442(1992)005<0105:troaco>2.0.co;2. ISSN 0894-8755.
- Manabe, Syukuro; Stouffer, Ronald J. (1995). "Simulation of abrupt climate change induced by freshwater input to the North Atlantic Ocean". Nature. 378 (6553). Springer: 165–167. Bibcode:1995Natur.378..165M. doi:10.1038/378165a0. ISSN 0028-0836. S2CID 4302999.
- Manabe, Syukuro; Stouffer, Ronald J. (1996). "Low-frequency variation of surface air temperature in a 1000-year integration of a coupled atmosphere-ocean-land surface coupled model". Journal of Climate. 9 (6553). American Meteorological Society: 376–393. Bibcode:1995Natur.378..165M. doi:10.1038/378165a0. ISSN 0028-0836. S2CID 4302999.
- Manabe, Syukuro; Stouffer, Ronald J. (1999). "The role of thermohaline circulation in climate". Tellus B. 51 (1): 91–109. Bibcode:1995Natur.378..165M. doi:10.1034/j.1600-0889.1999.00008.x. ISSN 0028-0836. S2CID 4302999.
- Manabe, Syukuro; Stouffer, Ronald J (2000). "Study of abrupt climate change by a coupled ocean–atmosphere model" (PDF). Quaternary Science Reviews. 19 (1–5). Elsevier BV: 285–299. Bibcode:2000QSRv...19..285M. doi:10.1016/s0277-3791(99)00066-9. ISSN 0277-3791.
- Manabe, Syukuro (2019). "Role of greenhouse gas in climate change". Tellus A. 71 (1): 1–12. Bibcode:2000QSRv...19..285M. doi:10.1080/16000870.2019.1620078. ISSN 0277-3791.
- Manabe, Syukuro; Broccoli, Anthony J. (2020). Beyond global warming : how numerical models revealed the secrets of climate change. Princeton: Princeton University Press. ISBN 978-0-691-05886-3. (Note that Japanese translation of this book is available.)
- Manabe, Syukuro (2023). "Nobel Lecture: Physical Modeling of Earth's Climate". Reviews of Modern Physics. 95 (1) 010501. American Physical Society. doi:10.1103/RevModPhys.95.010501.

== See also ==
- List of Nobel laureates affiliated with the University of Tokyo
- List of Nobel laureates affiliated with Princeton University
- List of Japanese Nobel laureates
- List of Asian Nobel laureates
- List of Nobel laureates
- "Thermal Equilibrium of the Atmosphere with a Given Distribution of Relative Humidity" (Manabe and Wetherald 1967)
