= Idealized greenhouse model =

Mathematical estimate of planetary temperatures

A schematic representation of a planet's radiation balance with its parent star and the rest of space. Thermal radiation absorbed and emitted by the idealized atmosphere can raise the surface temperature.

The temperatures of a planet's surface and atmosphere are governed by a delicate balancing of their energy flows. The idealized greenhouse model is based on the fact that certain gases in the Earth's atmosphere, including carbon dioxide and water vapour, are transparent to the high-frequency solar radiation, but are much more opaque to the lower frequency infrared radiation leaving Earth's surface. Thus heat is easily let in, but is partially trapped by these gases as it tries to leave. Rather than get hotter and hotter, Kirchhoff's law of thermal radiation says that the gases of the atmosphere also have to re-emit the infrared energy that they absorb, and they do so, also at long infrared wavelengths, both upwards into space as well as downwards back towards the Earth's surface. In the long-term, the planet's thermal inertia is surmounted and a new radiative equilibrium is reached when all energy arriving on the planet is leaving again at the same rate. In this steady-state model, the greenhouse gases cause the surface of the planet to be warmer than it would be without them, in order for a balanced amount of heat energy to finally be radiated out into space from the top of the atmosphere.

Essential features of this model were first published by Svante Arrhenius in 1896. It has since become a common introductory "textbook model" of the radiative heat transfer physics underlying Earth's energy balance and the greenhouse effect. The planet is idealized by the model as being functionally "layered" with regard to a sequence of simplified energy flows, but dimensionless (i.e. a zero-dimensional model) in terms of its mathematical space. The layers include a surface with constant temperature T_{s} and an atmospheric layer with constant temperature T_{a}. For diagrammatic clarity, a gap can be depicted between the atmosphere and the surface. Alternatively, T_{s} could be interpreted as a temperature representative of the surface and the lower atmosphere, and T_{a} could be interpreted as the temperature of the upper atmosphere, also called the skin temperature. In order to justify that T_{a} and T_{s} remain constant over the planet, strong oceanic and atmospheric currents can be imagined to provide plentiful lateral mixing. Furthermore, the temperatures are understood to be multi-decadal averages such that any daily or seasonal cycles are insignificant.

== Simplified energy flows ==
The model will find the values of T_{s} and T_{a} that will allow the outgoing radiative power, escaping the top of the atmosphere, to be equal to the absorbed radiative power of sunlight. When applied to a planet like Earth, the outgoing radiation will be longwave and the sunlight will be shortwave. These two streams of radiation will have distinct emission and absorption characteristics. In the idealized model, we assume the atmosphere is completely transparent to sunlight. The planetary albedo α_{P} is the fraction of the incoming solar flux that is reflected back to space (since the atmosphere is assumed totally transparent to solar radiation, it does not matter whether this albedo is imagined to be caused by reflection at the surface of the planet or at the top of the atmosphere or a mixture). The flux density of the incoming solar radiation is specified by the solar constant S_{0}. For application to planet Earth, appropriate values are S_{0}=1366 W m^{−2} and α_{P}=0.30. Accounting for the fact that the surface area of a sphere is 4 times the area of its intercept (its shadow), the average incoming radiation is S_{0}/4.

For longwave radiation, the surface of the Earth is assumed to have an emissivity of 1 (i.e. it is a black body in the infrared, which is realistic). The surface emits a radiative flux density F according to the Stefan–Boltzmann law:

$$F=\sigma T^4$$

where σ is the Stefan–Boltzmann constant. A key to understanding the greenhouse effect is Kirchhoff's law of thermal radiation. At any given wavelength the absorptivity of the atmosphere will be equal to the emissivity. Radiation from the surface could be in a slightly different portion of the infrared spectrum than the radiation emitted by the atmosphere. The model assumes that the average emissivity (absorptivity) is identical for either of these streams of infrared radiation, as they interact with the atmosphere. Thus, for longwave radiation, one symbol ε denotes both the emissivity and absorptivity of the atmosphere, for any stream of infrared radiation.

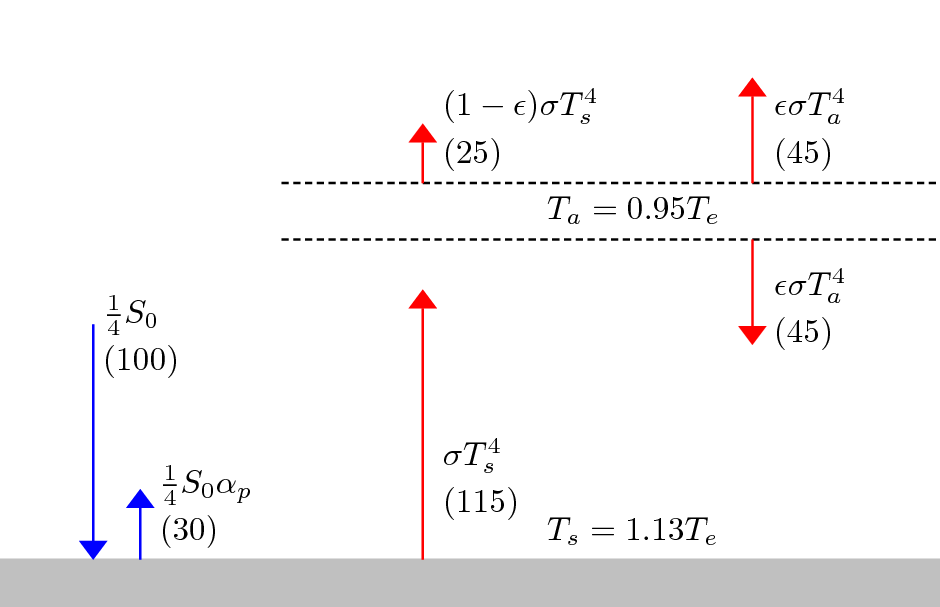
Idealized greenhouse model with an isothermal atmosphere. The blue arrows denote shortwave (solar) radiative flux density and the red arrow denotes longwave (terrestrial) radiative flux density. The radiation streams are shown with lateral displacement for clarity; they are collocated in the model. The atmosphere, which interacts only with the longwave radiation, is indicated by the layer within the dashed lines. A specific solution is depicted for ε=0.78 and α_{p}=0.3, representing Planet Earth. The numbers in the parentheses indicate the flux densities as a percent of S_{0}/4.

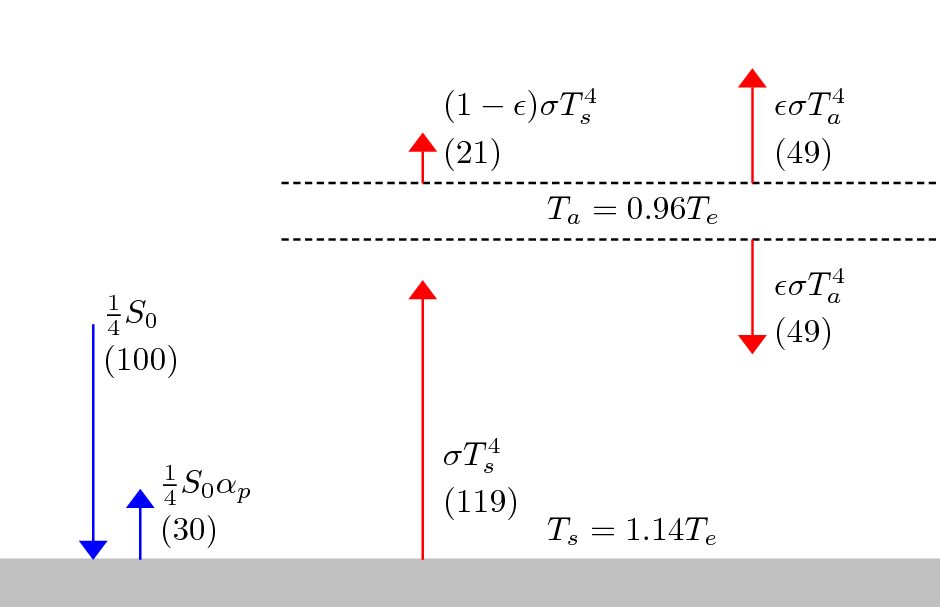
The equilibrium solution with ε=0.82. The increase by Δε=0.04 corresponds to doubling carbon dioxide and the associated positive feedback on water vapor.

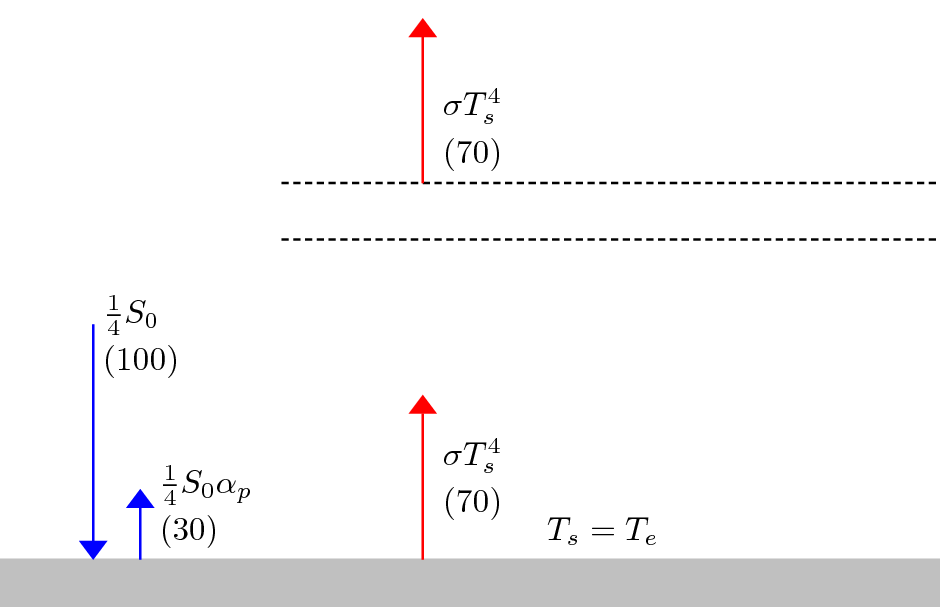
The equilibrium solution with no greenhouse effect: ε=0

The infrared flux density out of the top of the atmosphere is computed as:

$$F\uparrow =\epsilon \sigma T_a^4 + (1-\epsilon) \sigma T_s^4$$

In the last term, ε represents the fraction of upward longwave radiation from the surface that is absorbed, the absorptivity of the atmosphere. The remaining fraction (1-ε) is transmitted to space through an atmospheric window. In the first term on the right, ε is the emissivity of the atmosphere, the adjustment of the Stefan–Boltzmann law to account for the fact that the atmosphere is not optically thick. Thus ε plays the role of neatly blending, or averaging, the two streams of radiation in the calculation of the outward flux density.

== The energy balance solution ==
Zero net radiation leaving the top of the atmosphere requires:

$$-\frac{1}{4}S_0(1-\alpha_p)+\epsilon \sigma T_a^4 + (1-\epsilon) \sigma T_s^4= 0$$

Zero net radiation entering the surface requires:

$$\frac{1}{4}S_0(1-\alpha_p)+\epsilon \sigma T_a^4 - \sigma T_s^4 = 0$$

Energy equilibrium of the atmosphere can be either derived from the two above equilibrium conditions, or independently deduced:

$$2 \epsilon \sigma T_a^4 - \epsilon \sigma T_s^4 = 0$$

Note the important factor of 2, resulting from the fact that the atmosphere radiates both upward and downward. Thus the ratio of T_{a} to T_{s} is independent of ε:

$$T_s =  {2^{0.25}T_a}
=  { 1.189 T_a }$$

Thus T_{a} can be expressed in terms of T_{s}, and a solution is obtained for T_{s} in terms of the model input parameters:

$$\frac{1}{4}S_0(1-\alpha_p)= -\epsilon \sigma T_a^4 + \sigma T_s^4=\left( 1-\frac{\epsilon}{2} \right) \sigma T_s^4$$

or

$$T_s=\left[ \frac{S_0(1-\alpha_p)}{4\sigma} \frac{1}{1-{\epsilon \over 2}} \right]^{\frac{1}{4}}$$

The solution can also be expressed in terms of the effective emission temperature T_{e}, which is the temperature that characterizes the outgoing infrared flux density F, as if the radiator were a perfect radiator obeying F=σT_{e}^{4}. This is easy to conceptualize in the context of the model. T_{e} is also the solution for T_{s}, for the case of ε=0, or no atmosphere:

$$T_e \equiv \left[ \frac{\frac{1}{4} S_0(1-\alpha_p)}{\sigma}  \right]^{\frac{1}{4} }$$

With the definition of T_{e}:

$$T_s= T_e \left[ \frac{1}{1-{\epsilon \over 2}} \right]^{\frac{1}{4} }$$

For a perfect greenhouse, with no radiation escaping from the surface, or ε=1:

$$T_s= 2^{0.25} T_e = 1.189 T_e \qquad T_a=T_e$$

== Application to Earth ==
Using the parameters defined above to be appropriate for Earth,

$$T_e = 255 ~\mathrm{K} = -18 ~\mathrm{C}$$

For ε=1:

$$T_s = 303 ~\mathrm{K} = 30 ~\mathrm{C}$$

For ε=0.78,

$$T_s = 288.3 ~\mathrm{K} \qquad T_a = 242.5 ~\mathrm{K}$$.

This value of T_{s} happens to be close to the published 287.2 K of the average global "surface temperature" based on measurements. ε=0.78 implies 22% of the surface radiation escapes directly to space, consistent with the statement of 15% to 30% escaping in the greenhouse effect.

The radiative forcing for doubling carbon dioxide is 3.71 W m^{−2}, in a simple parameterization. This is also the value endorsed by the IPCC. From the equation for $F\uparrow$,

$$\Delta F\uparrow = \Delta\epsilon \left( \sigma T_a^4 -\sigma T_s^4 \right)$$

Using the values of T_{s} and T_{a} for ε=0.78 allows for $\Delta F\uparrow$= -3.71 W m^{−2} with Δε=.019. Thus a change of ε from 0.78 to 0.80 is consistent with the radiative forcing from a doubling of carbon dioxide. For ε=0.80,

$$T_s = 289.5  ~\mathrm{K}$$

Thus this model predicts a global warming of ΔT_{s} = 1.2 K for a doubling of carbon dioxide. A typical prediction from a GCM is 3 K surface warming, primarily because the GCM allows for positive feedback, notably from increased water vapor. A simple surrogate for including this feedback process is to posit an additional increase of Δε=.02, for a total Δε=.04, to approximate the effect of the increase in water vapor that would be associated with an increase in temperature. This idealized model then predicts a global warming of ΔT_{s} = 2.4 K for a doubling of carbon dioxide, roughly consistent with the IPCC.

=== Tabular summary with K, C, and F units ===
ε	T_{s} (K)	T_{s} (C)	T_{s} (F)
0	254.8	-18.3	-1
0.78	288.3	15.2	59
0.80	289.5	16.4	61
0.82	290.7	17.6	64
1	303.0	29.9	86

== Extensions ==
The one-level atmospheric model can be readily extended to a multiple-layer atmosphere. In this case the equations for the temperatures become a series of coupled equations. These simple energy-balance models always predict a decreasing temperature away from the surface, and all levels increase in temperature as "greenhouse gases are added". Neither of these effects are fully realistic: in the real atmosphere temperatures increase above the tropopause, and temperatures in that layer are predicted (and observed) to decrease as GHG's are added. This is directly related to the non-greyness of the real atmosphere.

An interactive version of a model with 2 atmospheric layers, and which accounts for convection, is available online.

== See also ==
- Atmospheric model
- Climate model
- Multi-compartment model
- Planetary equilibrium temperature

== Additional bibliography ==
- Bohren, Craig F.; Clothiaux, Eugene E. (2006). "1.6 Emissivity and Global Warming". Fundamentals of Atmospheric Radiation. Chichester: John Wiley & Sons. pp. 31–41. ISBN 978-3-527-40503-9.
- Petty, Grant W. (2006). "6.4.3 Simple Radiative Models of the Atmosphere". A First Course in Atmospheric Radiation (2nd ed.). Madison, Wisconsin: Sundog Pub. pp. 139–143. ISBN 978-0-9729033-1-8.
