= Nils Gustaf Ekholm =

Swedish meteorologist

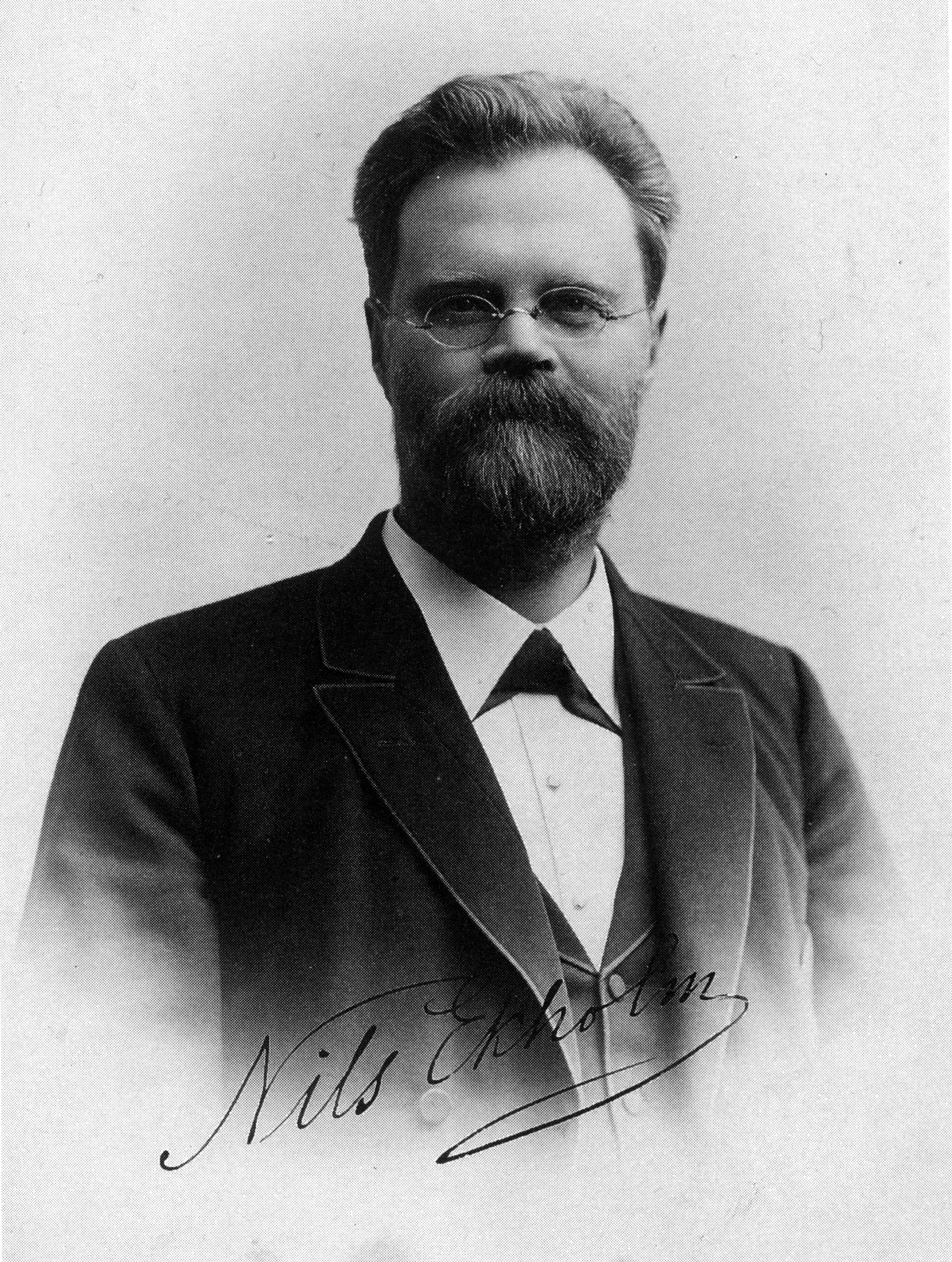
Nils Gustaf Ekholm in the 1890s, at the time of the S. A. Andrée expedition.

Nils Gustaf Ekholm (9 October 1848 – 5 April 1923) was a Swedish meteorologist who led a Swedish geophysical expedition to Spitsbergen in 1882–1883.

== Biography ==
Ekholm was born in Smedjebacken in Dalarna, son of a pharmacist. Having completed his mogenhetsexamen in 1868, he enrolled at the University of Uppsala in September 1869, and graduated with a Candidate of Philosophy degree in 1876, completing a Licentiate degree in 1887 and a Ph.D. in 1888. He was a student of Robert Rubenson and Hugo Hildebrand Hildebrandsson.

He worked at the Meteorological department at Uppsala University from 1876 until 1881, and again, after returning from his Spitsbergen expedition, 1884–1890, and was docent of meteorology at the university 1888–1892. From 1890 he worked as an assistant at the Swedish Meteorological Institute in Stockholm (one of the predecessor institutions of the current Swedish Meteorological and Hydrological Institute, SMHI, now located in Norrköping). He became professor and head of the institute in 1913, retiring at the age of 70 in 1918.

Ekholm was originally responsible only for the meteorological research of Andrée's Arctic balloon expedition (1897-1898). Ekholm was made head of the expedition as a whole after his predecessor, Commander F. Malmberg, had become unable to participate because of illness. The projected 1896 launch of engineer and balloonist S. A. Andrée's balloon from Spitsbergen was called off because of contrary winds. Ekholm later started to question the construction of the balloon, skeptical of its ability to keep hydrogen leakage to the minimum level necessary for the success of the expedition. When Andrée disregarded his warnings, Ekholm abandoned the expedition. Ekholm was replaced by Knut Frænkel. Following the 1897 balloon launch, the entire expedition perished.

Ekholm is regarded as the founder of the Swedish storm warning system, which he initiated during his time at the Meteorological Institute. The system began in 1905 with 27 storm warning stations on the Swedish west coast, and expanded over the following years until it finally covered the entire Swedish coastline from 1913.

Ekholm was elected a Fellow of the British Royal Meteorological Society in 1892, and a Member of the Royal Swedish Academy of Sciences in 1905.

In 1899, Ekholm, an early and eager spokesman for anthropogenic climatic control, pointed out that at present rates, the burning of coal eventually could double the concentration of atmospheric CO_{2}. According to Ekholm, being influenced by the thoughts of his lifelong friend and colleague Svante Arrhenius, this would "undoubtedly cause a very obvious rise of the mean temperature of the Earth." By controlling the production and consumption of CO_{2}, he thought humans would be able to "regulate the future climate of the Earth and consequently prevent the arrival of a new ice age." An English version published in 1901 in the Quarterly Journal of the Royal Meteorological Society resulted in wide dissemination of Ekholm's ideas, including the use of the term "greenhouse" to describe the effect of carbon dioxide). This paper noted the role of CO_{2} as a control of the level of water vapor in air, which acted as an amplifier of the greenhouse effect of CO_{2}. He stated:

"Aqueous vapour alone is, however, unable to produce any radical change of climate. For the quantity of aqueous vapour in the atmosphere is itself depending upon the temperature of the air; if this be lowered by some cause, for instance by radiation, the aqueous vapour is partly condensed and separated from the atmosphere, whereby its protecting influence is diminished, and then the increased radiation causes a new condensation of vapour, and so on. It is, therefore, only in regions and seasons already favoured by nature with a warm and damp climate that aqueous vapour alone is able to play the part of green-house glass; whereas in cold and dry regions, where the protection is most needed, aqueous vapour fails.

The case will be quite different when the carbonic acid comes into play. This gas is not condensed at any temperature occurring in the lower strata of the air. Its protecting power is thus equally active in all climates. If now the quantity of carbonic acid increases, the temperature, as already stated, will rise. But thereby also evaporation, and, of course, the quantity of aqueous vapour in the air, mill be increased, by which the radiation from earth into space will be still diminished."

== Publications ==
Ekholm, Nils (1901). "On the Variations of the Climate of the Geological and Historical Past and their Causes" (PDF). Quarterly Journal of the Royal Meteorological Society. XXVII (117): 1–61. doi:10.1002/qj.49702711702.
