= Skin temperature (atmosphere) =

Model approximation of atmospheric temperature

The skin temperature of an atmosphere is the temperature of a hypothetical thin layer high in the atmosphere that is transparent to incident solar radiation and partially absorbing of infrared radiation from the planet. It provides an approximation for the temperature of the tropopause on terrestrial planets with greenhouse gases present in their atmospheres.

The skin temperature of an atmosphere should not be confused with the surface skin temperature, which is more readily measured by satellites, and depends on the thermal emission at the surface of a planet.

== Background ==
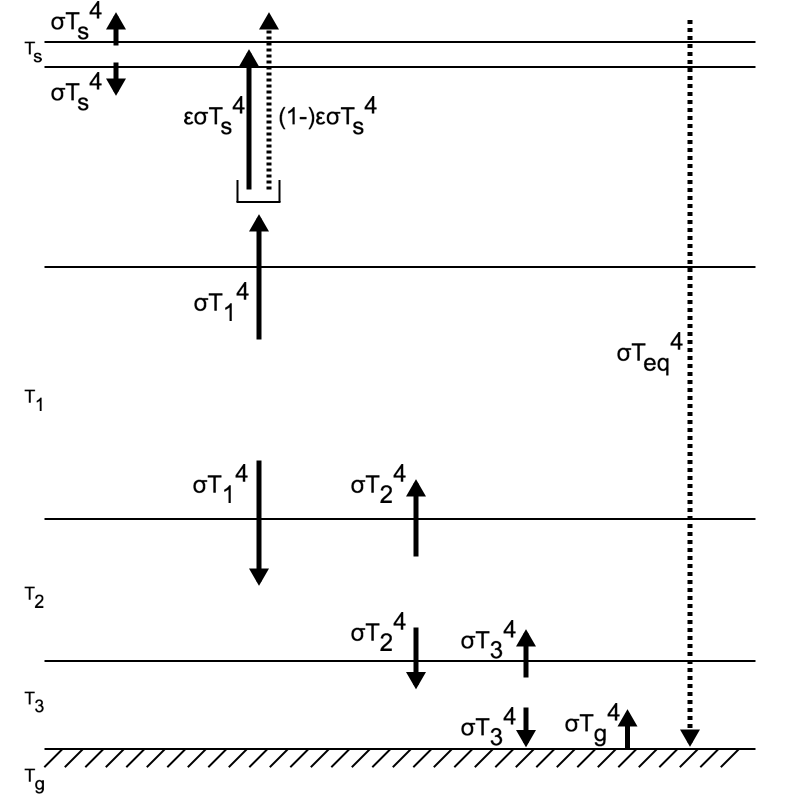
A multi-layered model of the atmosphere is shown, with the skin layer at the top. Arrows show energy fluxes exchanged between layers, and dotted lines indicate that the radiation passes through one or more layers. Note that the flux radiated upwards by the opaque layer at T_{1} must be equal to the incident solar flux, σT_{eq}^{4}. Thus T_{1} = T_{eq}.

The concept of a skin temperature builds on a radiative-transfer model of an atmosphere, in which the atmosphere of a planet is divided into an arbitrary number of layers. Each layer is transparent to the visible radiation from the Sun but acts as a blackbody in the infrared, fully absorbing and fully re-emitting infrared radiation originating from the planet's surface and from other atmospheric layers. Layers are warmer near the surface and colder at higher altitudes. If the planet's atmosphere is in radiative equilibrium, then the uppermost of these opaque layers should radiate infrared radiation upwards with a flux equal to the incident solar flux. The uppermost opaque layer (the emission level) will thus radiate as a blackbody at the planet's equilibrium temperature.

The skin layer of an atmosphere references a layer far above the emission level, at a height where the atmosphere is extremely diffuse. As a result, this thin layer is transparent to solar (visible) radiation and translucent to planetary/atmospheric (infrared) radiation. In other words, the skin layer acts as a graybody, because it is not a perfect absorber/emitter of infrared radiation. Instead, most of the infrared radiation coming from below (i.e. from the emission level) will pass through the skin layer, with only a small fraction being absorbed, resulting in a cold skin layer.

== Derivation ==
Consider a thin layer of gas high in the atmosphere with some absorptivity (i.e. the fraction of incoming energy that is absorbed), ε. If the emission layer has some temperature T_{eq}, the total flux reaching the skin layer from below is given by:

$F = \sigma T_{eq}^4$ assuming the emission layer of the atmosphere radiates like a blackbody according to the Stefan-Boltzmann law. σ is the Stefan-Boltzmann constant.

As a result:

$F_{in} = \epsilon\sigma T_{eq}^4$ is absorbed by the skin layer, while $F_{thru} = (1-\epsilon)\sigma T_{eq}^4$ passes through the skin layer, radiating directly into space.

Assuming the skin layer is at some temperature T_{s}, and using Kirchhoff's law (absorptivity = emissivity), the total radiation flux produced by the skin layer is given by:

$F_{out,Total} = 2\epsilon\sigma T_{s}^4$ where the factor of 2 comes from the fact that the skin layer radiates in both the upwards and downwards directions.

If the skin layer remains at a constant temperature, the energy fluxes in and out of the skin layer should be equal, so that:

$\epsilon\sigma T_{eq}^4 = 2\epsilon\sigma T_{s}^4$

Therefore, by rearranging the above equation, the skin temperature can be related to the equilibrium temperature of an atmosphere by:

$T_{s}=T_{eq}\left ( \frac{1}{2} \right )^{1/4}$

The skin temperature is thus independent of the absorptivity/emissivity of the skin layer.

== Applications ==
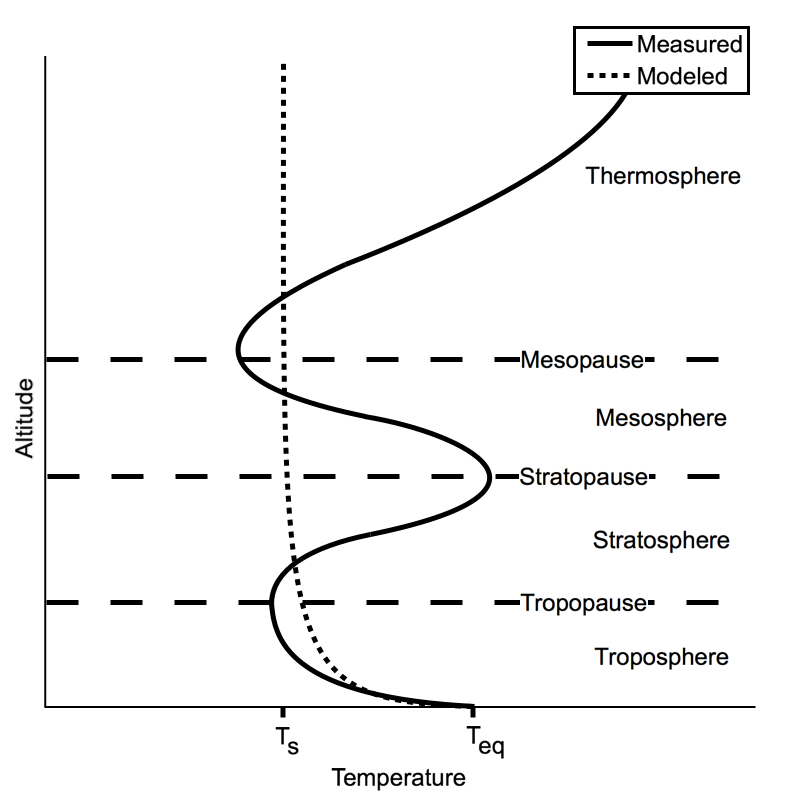
A theoretical temperature profile from a many-layered model (dotted) vs the measured temperature profile (solid) of the Earth's atmosphere. The named layers of the atmosphere apply only to the measured temperature profile, because their definition relies on the presence of inversions.

A multi-layered model of a greenhouse atmosphere will produce predicted temperatures for the atmosphere that decrease with height, asymptotically approaching the skin temperature at high altitudes. The temperature profile of the Earth's atmosphere does not follow this type of trend at all altitudes, as it exhibits two temperature inversions, i.e. regions where the atmosphere gets warmer with increasing altitude. These inversions take place in the stratosphere and the thermosphere, due to absorption of solar ultraviolet (UV) radiation by ozone and absorption of solar extreme ultraviolet (XUV) radiation respectively. Although the reality of Earth's atmospheric temperature profile deviates from the many-layered model due to these inversions, the model is relatively accurate within Earth's troposphere. The skin temperature is a close approximation for the temperature of the tropopause on Earth. An equilibrium temperature of 255 K on Earth yields a skin temperature of 214 K, which compares with a tropopause temperature of 209 K.
