= Economic analysis of climate change =

Economic analysis of climate change uses economic tools and models to calculate the scale and distribution of damages caused by climate change. It can also give guidance for the best policies for mitigation and adaptation to climate change from an economic perspective. There are many economic models and frameworks. For example, in a cost–benefit analysis, the trade offs between climate change impacts, adaptation, and mitigation are made explicit. For this kind of analysis, integrated assessment models (IAMs) are useful. Those models link main features of society and economy with the biosphere and atmosphere into one modelling framework.

In general, climate damages increase the more the global surface temperature increases. Many effects of climate change are linked to market transactions and therefore directly affect metrics like GDP or inflation. For instance, climate change can drive inflation in food via heat and droughts, but also drives up overall inflation. There are also non-market impacts which are harder to translate into economic costs. These include the impacts of climate change on human health, biomes and ecosystem services.

Economic analysis also looks at the economics of climate change mitigation and the cost of climate adaptation. Mitigation costs will vary according to how and when emissions are cut. Early, well-planned action will minimize the costs. Globally, the benefits and co-benefits of keeping warming under 2 °C exceed the costs. Cost estimates for mitigation for specific regions depend on the quantity of emissions allowed for that region in future, as well as the timing of policies. Economists estimate the incremental cost of climate change mitigation at less than 1% of GDP. Across all developing countries, adaptation costs have been estimated to be about US$215 billion per year up to 2030, and are expected to be higher after.

== Purposes ==
Economic analysis of climate change investigates the economic impacts of the effects of climate change, the costs and benefits of preventing climate change, and the cost of adapting to a changing climate. These analyses can focus on:

- Global aggregate economic costs of climate change (i.e. global climate damages)
- Sectoral or regional economic costs of climate change (e.g. costs to agriculture sector or energy services)
- Economic costs and benefits of implementing climate change mitigation and adaptation strategies
- Estimating the projected impacts to society per additional metric tonne of carbon emissions (social cost of carbon)
- informing policy decisions, interntionally or nationally

The economic impacts of climate change also include any mitigation (for example, limiting the global average temperature below 2 °C) or adaption (for example, building flood defences) employed by nations or groups of nations, which might infer economic consequences. Some regions or sectors may benefit from low levels of warming, for example through lower energy demand or improved crop yields.

In some areas, policies designed to mitigate climate change may contribute towards other sustainable development objectives, such as abolishing fossil fuel subsidies which would reduce air pollution and thus save lives. Direct global fossil fuel subsidies reached $319 billion in 2017, and $5.2 trillion when indirect costs such as air pollution are priced in. In other areas, the cost of climate change mitigation might divert resources away from other socially and environmentally beneficial investments (the opportunity costs of climate change policy).

== Types of economic models ==
Many economic tools are employed to understand the economic aspects around impacts of climate change, climate change mitigation and adaptation. Several approaches exist. Econometric models (statistical models) are used to estimate the impacts of weather and climate on economic variables, either globally or for a specific sector. Structural economic models look at market and non-market impacts affecting the whole economy through its inputs and outputs. Process models simulate physical, chemical and biological processes under climate change, and the economic effects.

=== Process-based models ===
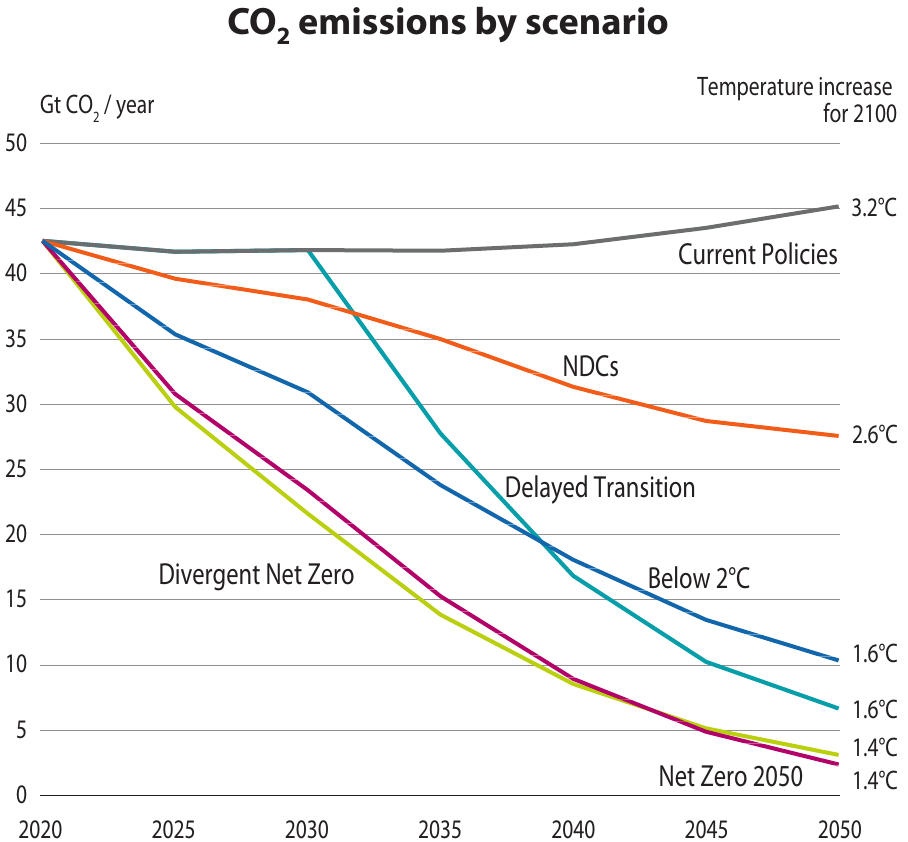
Annual greenhouse gas emissions in the various NGFS climate scenarios 2022, based on the REMIND-MAgPIE model by the Potsdam Institute for Climate Impact Research

Intergovernmental Panel on Climate Change (IPCC) has relied on process-based integrated assessment models (PB-IAM) to quantify mitigation scenarios. They have been used to explore different pathways for staying within climate policy targets such as the 1.5 °C target agreed upon in the Paris Agreement. Moreover, these models have underpinned research including energy policy assessment and simulate the Shared socioeconomic pathways. Notable modelling frameworks include IMAGE, MESSAGEix, AIM/GCE, GCAM, REMIND-MAgPIE, and WITCH-GLOBIOM. While these scenarios are highly policy-relevant, interpretation of the scenarios should be done with care.

Non-equilibrium models include those based on econometric equations and evolutionary economics (such as E3ME), and agent-based models (such as the agent-based DSK-model). These models typically do not assume rational and representative agents, nor market equilibrium in the long term.

=== Structural models ===
==== Computable general equilibrium models ====
Computable general equilibrium (CGE) models are a class of economic models that use actual economic data to estimate how an economy might react to changes in policy, technology or other external factors. CGE models are also referred to as AGE (applied general equilibrium) models. A CGE model consists of equations describing model variables and a database (usually very detailed) consistent with these model equations. The equations tend to be neoclassical in spirit, often assuming cost-minimizing behaviour by producers, average-cost pricing, and household demands based on optimizing behaviour.

CGE models are useful in estimating the effect of changes in one part of the economy on the rest. They have been used widely to analyse trade policy. More recently, CGE has been a popular way to estimate the economic effects of measures to reduce greenhouse gas emissions.

==== Aggregate cost-benefit models ====
Integrated assessment models (IAMs) are also used to make aggregate estimates of the costs of climate change. These (cost-benefit) models balance the economic implications of mitigation and climate damages to identify the pathway of emissions reductions that will maximize total economic welfare. In other words, the trade-offs between climate change impacts, adaptation, and mitigation are made explicit. The costs of each policy and the outcomes modelled are converted into monetary estimates.

The models incorporate aspects of the natural, social, and economic sciences in a highly aggregated way. Compared to other climate-economy models (including process-based IAMs), they do not have the structural detail necessary to model interactions with energy systems, land-use etc. and their economic implications.

=== Statistical (econometric) methods ===
A third modelling approach uses empirical, statistical methods to investigate how the economy is affected by weather variation. This approach can identify effects of temperature, rainfall, drought and storms on agriculture, energy demand, industry and other economic activity. Panel data of weather variation over time and space, e.g. from ground station observations or (interpolated) gridded data is aggregated for economic analysis to investigate effects on national economies. These studies show that for example, hot years are linked to lower income growth in poor countries, and low rainfall is linked to reduced incomes in Africa. Other econometric studies show that there are negative impacts of hotter temperatures on agricultural output, on labour productivity and in outdoor industries such as mining and forestry. The analyses are used to estimate the costs of climate change in the future.

== Analytical frameworks ==
=== Cost–benefit analysis ===
Standard cost–benefit analysis (CBA) has been applied to the problem of climate change. In a CBA framework, the negative and positive impacts associated with a given action are converted into monetary estimates. This is also referred to as a monetized cost–benefit framework. Various types of model can provide information for CBA, including energy-economy-environment models (process models) that study energy systems and their transitions. Some of these models may include a physical model of the climate. Computable General Equilibrium (CGE) structural models investigate effects of policies (including climate policies) on economic growth, trade, employment, and public revenues. However, most CBA analyses are produced using aggregate integrated assessment models. These aggregate-type IAMs are particularly designed for doing CBA of climate change.

The CBA framework requires (1) the valuation of costs and benefits using willingness to pay (WTP) or willingness to accept (WTA) compensation as a measure of value, and (2) a criterion for accepting or rejecting proposals:

For (1), in CBA where WTP/WTA is used, climate change impacts are aggregated into a monetary value, with environmental impacts converted into consumption equivalents, and risk accounted for using certainty equivalents. Values over time are then discounted to produce their equivalent present values. The valuation of costs and benefits of climate change can be controversial because some climate change impacts are difficult to assign a value to, e.g., ecosystems and human health.

For (2), the standard criterion is the Kaldor–Hicks compensation principle. According to the compensation principle, so long as those benefiting from a particular project compensate the losers, and there is still something left over, then the result is an unambiguous gain in welfare. If there are no mechanisms allowing compensation to be paid, then it is necessary to assign weights to particular individuals. One of the mechanisms for compensation is impossible for this problem: mitigation might benefit future generations at the expense of current generations, but there is no way that future generations can compensate current generations for the costs of mitigation. On the other hand, should future generations bear most of the costs of climate change, compensation to them would not be possible.

CBA has several strengths: it offers an internally consistent and global comprehensive analysis of impacts. Furthermore, sensitivity analysis allows critical assumptions in CBA analysis to be changed. This can identify areas where the value of information is highest and where additional research might have the highest payoffs. However, there are many uncertainties that affect cost–benefit analysis, for example, sector- and country-specific damage functions.

==== Damage functions ====
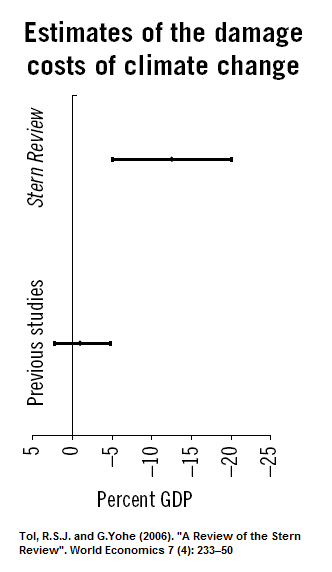
This graph shows estimation confidence intervals from a meta-analysis of researchers as well as by the Stern Review in 2006 (damage costs measured as percent GDP).

Damage functions play an important role in estimating the costs associated with potential damages caused by climate-related hazards. They quantify the relationship between the intensity of the hazard, other factors such as the vulnerability of the system, and the resulting damages. For example, damage functions have been developed for sea level rise, agricultural productivity, or heat effects on labour productivity.

=== Cost-effectiveness analysis ===
Cost-Effectiveness Analysis (CEA) is preferable to CBA when the benefits of impacts, adaptation and mitigation are difficult to estimate in monetary terms. A CEA can be used to compare different policy options for achieving a well-defined goal. This goal (i.e. the benefit) is usually expressed as the amount of GHG emissions reduction in the analysis of mitigation measures. For adaptation measures, there is no common goal or metric for the economic benefits. Adaptation involves responding to different types of risks in different sectors and local contexts. For example, the goal might be the reduction of land area in hectares at risk to sea level rise.

CEA involves the costing of each option, providing a cost per unit of effectiveness. For example, cost per tonne of GHG reduced ($/tCO2). This allows the ranking of policy options. This ranking can help decision-maker to understand which are the most cost-effective options, i.e. those that deliver high benefits for low costs. CEA can be used for minimising net costs for achieving pre-defined policy targets, such as meeting an emissions reduction target for a given sector.

CEA, like CBA, is a type of decision analysis method. Many of these methods work well when different stakeholders work together on a problem to understand and manage risks. For example, by discussing how well certain options might work in the real world. Or by helping in measuring the costs and benefits as part of a CEA.

Some authors have focused on a disaggregated analysis of climate change impacts. "Disaggregated" refers to the choice to assess impacts in a variety of indicators or units, e.g., changes in agricultural yields and loss of biodiversity. By contrast, monetized CBA converts all impacts into a common unit (money), which is used to assess changes in social welfare.

Scaling the effect of wealth to the national level: richer (developed) countries emit more CO_{2} per person than poorer (developing) countries. Emissions are roughly proportional to GDP per person, though the rate of increase diminishes with an average GDP/pp of about $10,000.

=== Scenario-based assessments ===
The long time scales and uncertainty when it comes to global warming have led analysts to develop "scenarios" of future environmental, social and economic changes. These scenarios can help governments understand the potential consequences of their decisions.

The projected temperature in climate change scenarios is subject to scientific uncertainty (e.g., the relationship between concentrations of GHGs and global mean temperature, which is called the climate sensitivity). Projections of future atmospheric concentrations based on emission pathways are also affected by scientific uncertainties, e.g., over how carbon sinks, such as forests, will be affected by future climate change.

One of the economic aspects of climate change is producing scenarios of future economic development. Future economic developments can, for example, affect how vulnerable society is to future climate change, what the future impacts of climate change might be, as well as the level of future GHG emissions.

Scenarios are neither "predictions" nor "forecasts" but are stories of possible futures that provide alternate outcomes relevant to a decision-maker or other user. These alternatives usually also include a "baseline" or reference scenario for comparison. "Business-as-usual" scenarios have been developed in which there are no additional policies beyond those currently in place, and socio-economic development is consistent with recent trends. This term is now used less frequently than in the past.

In scenario analysis, scenarios are developed that are based on differing assumptions of future development patterns. An example of this are the shared socioeconomic pathways produced by the Intergovernmental Panel on Climate Change (IPCC). These project a wide range of possible future emissions levels.

Scenarios often support sector-specific analysis of the physical effects and economic costs of climate change. Scenarios are used with cost–benefit analysis or cost-effectiveness analysis of climate policies.

=== Risk management ===
Risk management can be used to evaluate policy decisions based a range of criteria or viewpoints. Another approach is that of uncertainty analysis, where analysts attempt to estimate the probability of future changes in emission levels. Considerations in a risk-based approach might include, for example, the potential for low-probability, worst-case climate change impacts.

In a cost-benefit analysis, an acceptable risk means that the benefits of a climate policy outweigh the costs of the policy. The rule used by many decision makers is that a risk is acceptable if the anticipated net present value is positive. The expected value is the mean of the distribution of expected outcomes. In other words, it is the average expected outcome for a particular decision. This criterion has been justified under the conditions that:

- a policy's benefits and costs have known probabilities
- economic agents (people and organizations) can reduce their risk through insurance and other markets.

These assumptions are not often met, as it is challenging to estimate the costs of climate change, and that many benefits (like improved health) are not easily converted into monetary terms. Insurance is also not always an option, as climate disasters usually hit many people at once, making mutual aid difficult to implement.

Policymakers and investors are beginning to recognize the implications of climate change for the financial sector, from both physical risks (damage to property, infrastructure, and land) and transition risk due to changes in policy, technology, and consumer and market behavior. Financial institutions are becoming increasingly aware of the need to incorporate the economics of low carbon emissions into business models.

In the scientific literature, there is sometimes a focus on "best estimate" or "likely" values of climate sensitivity. However, from a risk management perspective, values outside of "likely" ranges are relevant, because, though these values are less probable, they could be associated with more severe climate impacts (the statistical definition of risk = probability of an impact × magnitude of the impact).

Analysts have also looked at how uncertainty over climate sensitivity affects economic estimates of climate change impacts. Policy guidance from cost-benefit analysis (CBA) can be extremely divergent depending on the assumptions employed. Hassler et al use integrated assessment modeling to examine a range of estimates and what happens at extremes.

==== Iterative risk management ====
Two related ways of thinking about the problem of climate change decision-making in the presence of uncertainty are iterative risk management and sequential decision making. One of the responses to the uncertainties of global warming is to adopt a strategy of sequential decision making. This involves making a series of observations before making a final decision.

An approach based on sequential decision making recognizes that, over time, decisions related to climate change can be revised in the light of improved information. This is particularly important with respect to climate change, due to the long-term nature of the problem. A near-term hedging strategy concerned with reducing future climate impacts might favor stringent, near-term emissions reductions. As stated earlier, carbon dioxide accumulates in the atmosphere, and to stabilize the atmospheric concentration of CO_{2}, emissions would need to be drastically reduced from their present level. Stringent near-term emissions reductions allow for greater future flexibility with regard to a low stabilization target, e.g., 450 parts per million (ppm) CO_{2}. This option may be lost if near-term emissions abatement is less stringent.

Another way of viewing the problem is to look at the potential irreversibility of future climate change impacts (e.g., damages to biomes and ecosystems) against the irreversibility of making investments in efforts to reduce emissions.

==== Portfolio analysis ====
One risk management framework is portfolio analysis. This approach is based on portfolio theory, originally applied in the areas of finance and investment. The idea is that a reasonable response to uncertainty is to invest in a wide portfolio of options to spread risk. It is important to compare alternative portfolios of options across different future climate change scenarios in order to take into account uncertainty in climate impacts, GHG emission trends etc. The options should ideally be diversified to be effective in different scenarios: i.e. some options suited for a no/low climate change scenario, with other options being suited for scenarios with severe climate changes.

== Costs of climate impacts ==
=== At the global level ===
Estimates of damage to GDP vary widely, and even this approach to predicting damage does not consider impacts of climate tipping points, climate-driven extreme events, human health impacts, resource or migration-driven conflict, geopolitical tension, nature-driven risks, or sea level rise.

Non-linear growth in the global warming effect of accumulating long-lived greenhouse gases contributed to economic damages over a 60-year period estimated to be over five times as large as that of a 30-year period (shown in chart). A Nature article estimated future damages from past emissions to be at least an order of magnitude larger than historical damages from the same emissions.

There is a growing number of weather-related disasters in the United States costing above one billion dollars

Global aggregate costs are all the predicted impacts of climate change across all market sectors (e.g. including costs to agriculture, energy services and tourism) and also includes non-market impacts (e.g. on ecosystems and human health).

Estimates are found to increase non-linearly with global average temperature change. The 2022 IPCC report finds that with high warming (~4 °C) and low adaptation, annual global GDP might be reduced by 10–23% by 2100 because of climate change. The same assessment finds smaller GDP changes with reductions of 1–8%, assuming low warming, more adaptation, and using different models. These estimates do not take into account climate tipping points well. In addition, these global economic cost estimates do not take into account impacts on social well-being or welfare or distributional effects.

Climate damages estimated statistically usually only look only how national weather variations impact GDP. A 2025 study explored adding global weather changes into the statistical analysis, given the trade between countries and how strongly one economy depends on another. This raised the estimates of climate damages from 11% to 40% in 2100 under a very high emission scenario.

Another study, which checked the data from the last 120 years, found that climate change has already reduced welfare by 29% and further temperature rise will bring this number to 47%. The temperature rise between 1960 and 2019 cut current GDP per person by 18%. A rise by 1 degree in global temperature reduces global GDP by 12%. An increase of 3 degrees by 2100, will reduce capital by 50%. The effects are like experiencing the 1929 Great Depression permanently. The associated social cost of carbon is 1065 dollars per tonne of CO_{2}.

Global economic losses due to extreme weather, climate and water events are increasing. Costs have increased sevenfold from the 1970s to the 2010s. Direct losses from disasters have averaged above US$330 billion annually between 2015 and 2021. Climate change has contributed to the increased probability and magnitude of extreme events. When a vulnerable community is exposed to extreme climate or weather events, disasters can occur. Socio-economic factors have contributed to the observed trend of global disaster losses, such as population growth and increased wealth. This shows that increased exposure is the most important driver of losses. However, part of these are also due to human-induced climate change. Extreme event attribution quantifies how climate change is altering the probability and magnitude of extreme events. On a case-by-case basis, it is feasible to estimate how the magnitude and/or probability of the extreme event has shifted due to climate change. These attributable changes have been identified for many individual extreme heat events and rainfall events. Using all available data on attributable changes, one study estimated the global losses to average US$143 billion per year between 2000 and 2019. This includes a statistical loss of life value of 90 billion and economic damages of 53 billion per year.

One 2020 study estimated economic losses due to climate change could be between 127 and 616 trillion dollars extra until 2100 with current commitments, compared to 1.5 °C or well below 2 °C compatible action. Failure to implement current commitments raises economic losses to 150–792 trillion dollars until 2100. A 2026 study published in Nature estimated that, from 1990 through 2020, carbon dioxide emissions in the US caused $10.2 trillion in cumulative damages by 2020, with about 30% occurring within the US itself. Damages from China were estimated at $8.7 trillion, and from the EU, $6.42 trillion. The researchers said that future damages from past emissions are at least an order of magnitude larger than historical damages from the same emissions.

Economic impacts also include inflation from rising insurance premiums, energy costs and food prices. Overall impacts of inflation range from 0.32 to 1.18 percentage points per year, depending on the socio-economic future and future emissions. That is, if a country's inflation without climate change would be 2.0%, it could raise to 2.3% to 3.2% per year with climate change. For food inflation, the estimate ranges between 0.92 and 3.23 percentage points.

==== High emissions scenarios ====
The total economic impacts from climate change increase for higher temperature changes. For instance, total damages are estimated to be 90% less if global warming is limited to 1.5 °C compared to 3.66 °C, a warming level chosen to represent no mitigation. In an Oxford Economics study high emission scenario, a temperature rise of 2 degrees by the year 2050 would reduce global GDP by 2.5–7.5%. By the year 2100 in this case, the temperature would rise by 4 degrees, which could reduce the global GDP by 30% in the worst case.

One 2018 study found that potential global economic gains if countries implement mitigation strategies to comply with the 2 °C target set at the Paris Agreement are in the vicinity of US$17 trillion per year up to 2100, compared to a very high emission scenario.

=== Underestimation of economic impacts ===
The amount by which greenhouse gas emissions are reduced is forecast to substantially affect the number of Winter Olympic Game venues that will have reliably snowy conditions.

Though Europe and North America have the most potential venues for Olympic Winter Games, a higher portion of those venues are projected to be climatically unreliable because of global warming.

Studies in 2019 suggested that economic damages due to climate change have been underestimated, and may be severe, with the probability of disastrous tail-risk events.

Tipping points are critical thresholds that, when crossed, lead to large, accelerating and often irreversible changes in the climate system. The science of tipping points is complex and there is great uncertainty as to how they might unfold. Economic analyses often exclude the potential effect of tipping points. A 2018 study noted that the global economic impact is underestimated by a factor of two to eight, when tipping points are excluded from consideration.

The Stern Review from 2006 for the British Government predicted that world GDP would be reduced by several percent due to climate related costs. However, their calculations may omit ecological effects that are difficult to quantify economically (such as human deaths or loss of biodiversity) or whose economic consequences will manifest slowly. Therefore, their calculations may be an underestimate. The study has received both criticism and support from other economists. A 2026 study by Orlov and other researchers found that current economic models still have trouble showing the full economic impact of climate change, especially when it comes to extreme weather events. Many of the models leave out certain climate risks and don't fully consider how damage in one industry or region can affect others. Because of these gaps, it is difficult to accurately estimate the total economic cost of climate change.

=== By region ===
Other studies investigate economic losses by GDP change per country or by per country per capita. Findings show large differences among countries and within countries. The estimated GDP changes in some developing countries are similar to some of the worst country-level losses during historical economic recessions. Economic losses are risks to living standards, which are more likely to be severe in developing countries. Climate change can push more people into extreme poverty or keep people poor, especially through particularly climate-sensitive sectors such as agriculture and fisheries. Climate change may also increase income inequality within countries as well as between them, particularly affecting low-income groups.

According to a study by reinsurance company Swiss Re in 2021 the economies of wealthy countries like the US would likely shrink by approximately 7%, while some developing nations would be devastated, losing around 20% or in some cases 40% of their economic output.

A United States government report in November 2018 raised the possibility of US GDP going down 10% as a result of the warming climate, including huge shifts in geography, demographics and technology.

=== By sector ===
The distribution of warming impacts from emitters has been unequal, with high-income, high-emitting countries benefitting while harming low-income, low-emitting countries.

A number of economic sectors will be affected by climate change, including the livestock, forestry, and fisheries industries. Other sectors sensitive to climate change include the energy, insurance, tourism and recreation industries.

==== Health and productivity ====
Among the health impacts that have been studied, aggregate costs of heat stress (through loss of work time) have been estimated, as have the costs of malnutrition. However, it is usual for studies to aggregate the number of 'years of life lost' adjusted for years living with disability to measure effects on health.

In 2019 the International Labour Organization published a report titled: "Working on a warmer planet: The impact of heat stress on labour productivity and decent work", in which it claims that even if the rise in temperature will be limited to 1.5 degree, by the year 2030, Climate Change will cause losses in productivity reaching 2.2% of all the working hours, every year. This is equivalent to 80 million full-time jobs, or 2,400 billion dollars. The sector expected to be most affected is agriculture, which is projected to account for 60% of this loss. The construction sector is also projected to be severely impacted and accounts for 19% of projected losses. Other sectors that are most at risk are environmental goods and services, refuse collection, emergency, repair work, transport, tourism, sports and some forms of industrial work.

It has been estimated that 3.5 million people die prematurely each year from air pollution from fossil fuels. The health benefits of meeting climate goals substantially outweigh the costs of action. The health benefits of phasing out fossil fuels measured in money (estimated by economists using the value of life for each country) are substantially more than the cost of achieving the 2 degree C goal of the Paris Agreement.

==== Agriculture ====
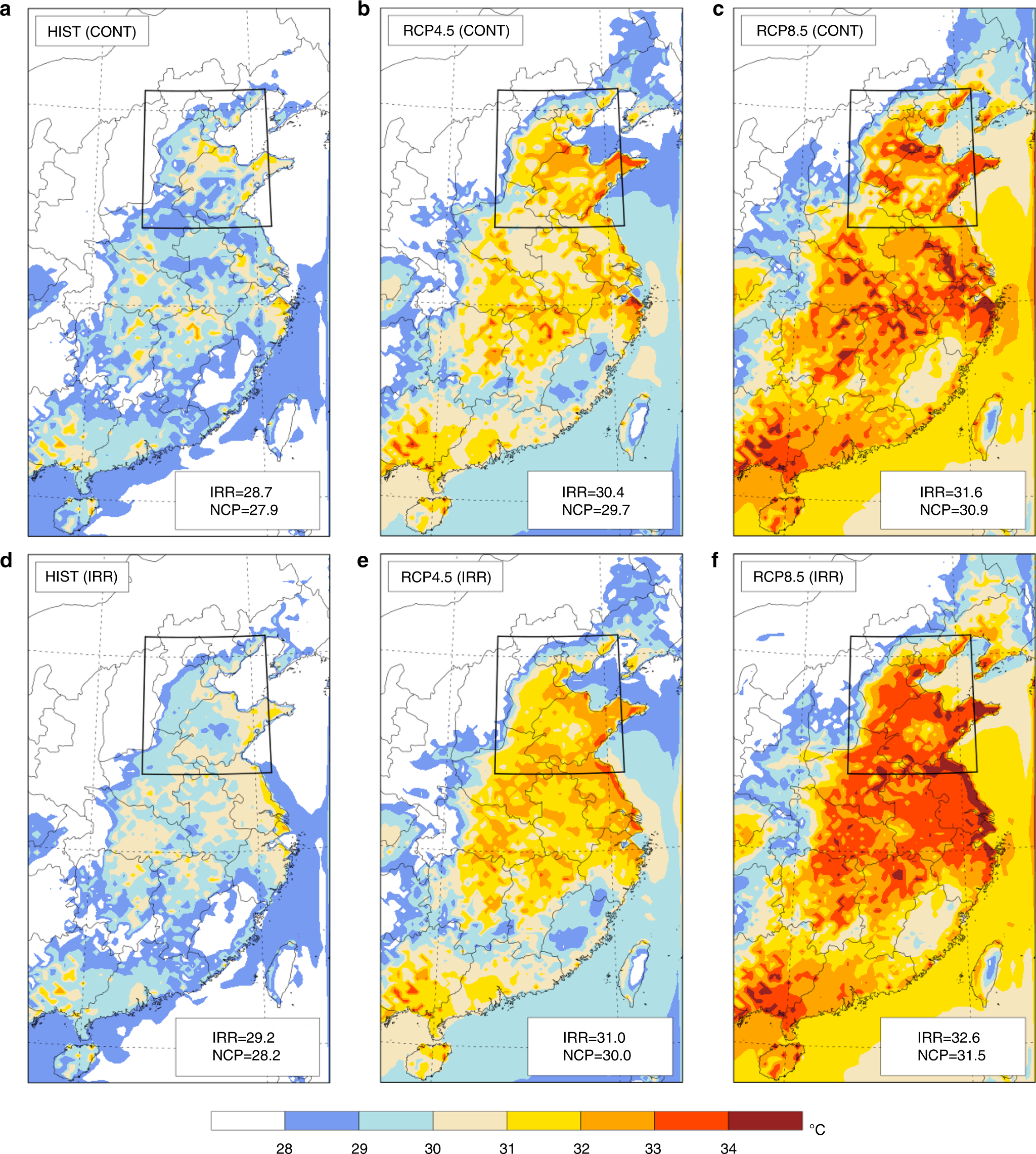
Climate change is expected to exacerbate heat stress over at the North China Plain, which is particularly vulnerable as widespread irrigation results in very moist air. There is a risk that agricultural labourers will be physically unable to work outdoors on hot summer days, particularly under the scenario of greatest emissions and warming.

As extreme weather events become more common and more intense, floods and droughts can destroy crops and eliminate food supply, while disrupting agricultural activities and rendering workers jobless. With more costs to the farmer, some will no longer find it financially feasible to farm: i.e. some farmers may choose to permanently leave drought-affected areas. Agriculture employs the majority of the population in most low-income countries and increased costs can result in worker layoffs or pay cuts. Other farmers will respond by raising their food prices; a cost that is directly passed on to the consumer and affects the affordability of food. Some farms do not sell their produce but instead feed a family or community; without that food, people will not have enough to eat. This results in decreased production, increased food prices, and potential starvation in parts of the world. The agriculture industry in India makes up 52% of their employment and the Canadian Prairies supply 51% of Canadian agriculture; any changes in the production of food crops from these areas could have profound effects on the economy.

Notably, one estimate suggests that a warming of 3 °C (5.4 °F) relative to late 20th century (i.e. closer to 4 °C (7.2 °F) when compared to preindustrial temperatures – a level associated with the SSP5-8.5 scenario) would cause labour capacity in Sub-Saharan Africa and Southeast Asia to decline by 30 to 50%, as the number of days when outdoor workers experience heat stress increases: up to 250 days the worst-affected parts of these two continents and of Central and South America. This could then increase crop prices by around 5%.

Similarly, North China Plain is also expected to be highly affected, in part due to the region's extensive irrigation networks resulting in unusually moist air. In scenarios without aggressive action to stop climate change, some heatwaves could become extreme enough to cause mass mortality in outdoor labourers, although they will remain relatively uncommon (up to around once per decade starting from 2100 under the most extreme scenario).

Further, the role of climate change in undernutrition and micronutrient deficiencies can be calculated as the loss of "years of full health".One estimate presented in 2016 suggests that under the scenario of strong warming and low adaptation due to high global conflict and rivalry, such losses may take up 0.4% of the global GDP and 4% of the GDP in India and the South Asian region by the year 2100.

==== Industry ====
Carbon-intensive industries and investors are expected to experience a significant increase in stranded assets with a potential ripple effect throughout the world economy.

=== Impacts on living costs ===
The effects of climate change contribute to inflation due to additional costs. For example, food prices could rise by as much as 3% per year due to climate change impacts. Climate change was one of the factors involved in the world food crises (2022–2023), which led to higher food prices.

Natural disasters fueled by climate change have increased housing costs through insurance and by exacerbating housing shortages when those events make homes unlivable.

=== Utility of aggregated assessment ===
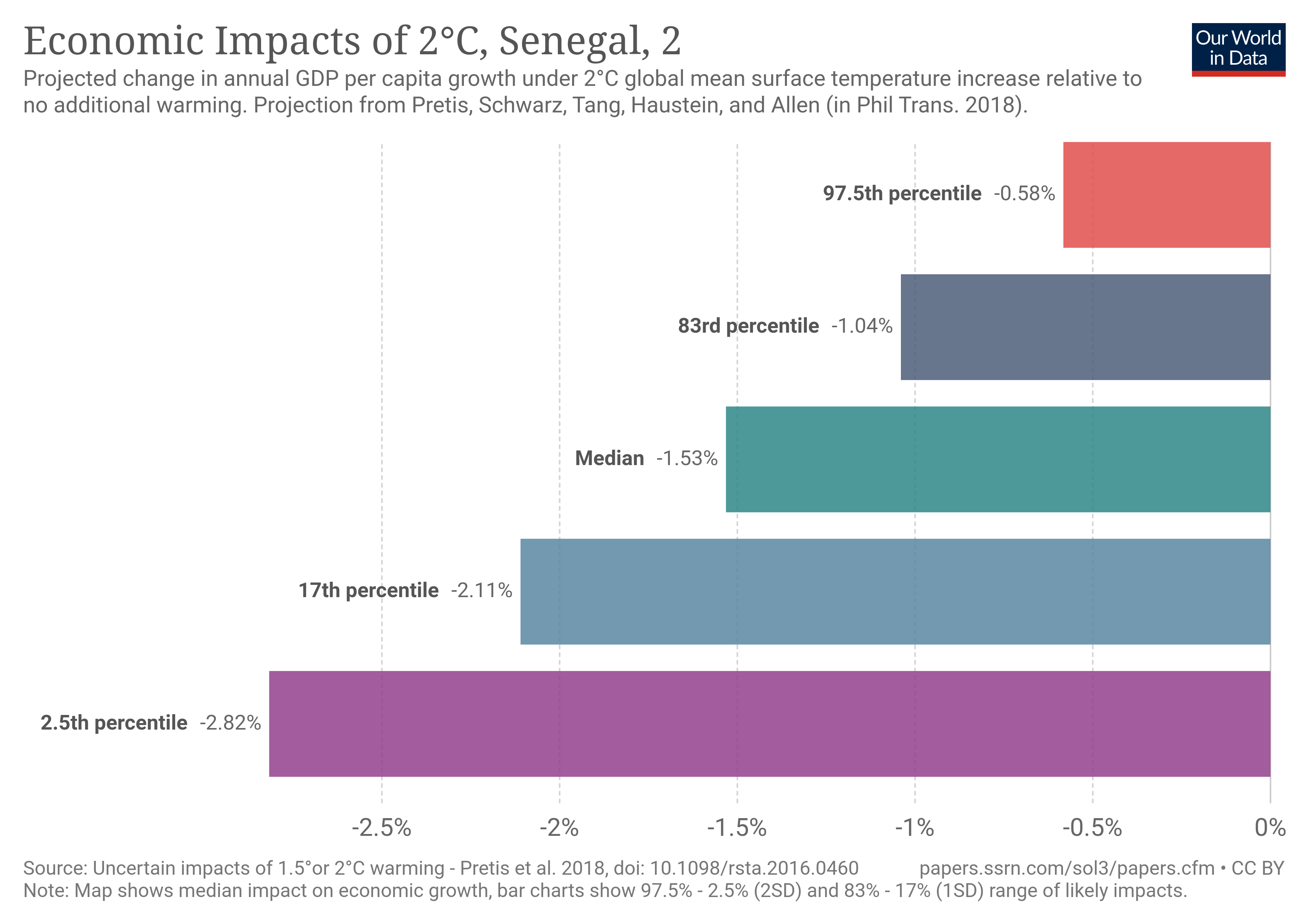
Projected economic impacts of 2 degrees of global warming on Senegal

There are a number of benefits of using aggregated assessments to measure economic impacts of climate change. They allow impacts to be directly compared between different regions and times. Impacts can be compared with other environmental problems and also with the costs of avoiding those impacts. A problem of aggregated analyses is that they often reduce different types of impacts into a small number of indicators. It can be argued that some impacts are not well-suited to this, e.g., the monetization of mortality and loss of species diversity. On the other hand, where there are monetary costs of avoiding impacts, it may not be possible to avoid monetary valuation of those impacts.

== Costs of mitigation ==
Climate change mitigation consist of human actions to reduce greenhouse gas emissions or to enhance carbon sinks that absorb greenhouse gases from the atmosphere.

A study published in 2024 showed that keeping global warming below 2 °C may cost about 1% of world GDP each year, but could prevent much larger losses of 10–20% of GDP by mid century.

Several factors affect mitigation cost estimates. One is the baseline. This is a reference scenario that the alternative mitigation scenario is compared with. Others are the way costs are modelled, and assumptions about future government policy. Cost estimates for mitigation for specific regions depend on the quantity of emissions allowed for that region in future, as well as the timing of interventions.

Mitigation costs will vary according to how and when emissions are cut. Early, well-planned action will minimise the costs. Globally, the benefits of keeping warming under 2 °C exceed the costs, which according to The Economist are affordable.

Economists estimate the cost of climate change mitigation at between 1% and 2% of GDP. While this is a large sum, it is still far less than the subsidies governments provide to the fossil fuel industry. The International Monetary Fund estimated this at more than $5 trillion per year. A 2024 opinion poll found 69% of the global population were willing to volunteer 1% of their income for climate change mitigation.

Another estimate says that financial flows for climate mitigation and adaptation are going to be over $800 billion per year. These financial requirements are predicted to exceed $4 trillion per year by 2030.

Globally, limiting warming to 2 °C may result in higher economic benefits than economic costs. The economic repercussions of mitigation vary widely across regions and households, depending on policy design and level of international cooperation. Delayed global cooperation increases policy costs across regions, especially in those that are relatively carbon intensive at present. Pathways with uniform carbon values show higher mitigation costs in more carbon-intensive regions, in fossil-fuels exporting regions and in poorer regions. Aggregate quantifications expressed in GDP or monetary terms undervalue the economic effects on households in poorer countries. The actual effects on welfare and well-being are comparatively larger.

Cost–benefit analysis may be unsuitable for analysing climate change mitigation as a whole. But it is still useful for analysing the difference between a 1.5 °C target and 2 °C. One way of estimating the cost of reducing emissions is by considering the likely costs of potential technological and output changes. Policymakers can compare the marginal abatement costs of different methods to assess the cost and amount of possible abatement over time. The marginal abatement costs of the various measures will differ by country, by sector, and over time.

Eco-tariffs on only imports contribute to reduced global export competitiveness and to deindustrialisation.

=== Global costs of mitigation ===
Mitigation cost estimates depend critically on the baseline (in this case, a reference scenario that the alternative scenario is compared with), the way costs are modelled, and assumptions about future government policy. Macroeconomic costs in 2030 were estimated for multi-gas mitigation (reducing emissions of carbon dioxide and other GHGs, such as methane) as between a 3% decrease in global GDP to a small increase, relative to baseline. This was for an emissions pathway consistent with atmospheric stabilization of GHGs between 445 and 710 ppm CO_{2}-eq. In 2050, the estimated costs for stabilization between 710 and 445 ppm CO_{2}-eq ranged between a 1% gain to a 5.5% decrease in global GDP, relative to baseline. These cost estimates were supported by a moderate amount of evidence and much agreement in the literature.

Macroeconomic cost estimates were mostly based on models that assumed transparent markets, no transaction costs, and perfect implementation of cost-effective policy measures across all regions throughout the 21st century. Relaxation of some or all these assumptions would lead to an appreciable increase in cost estimates. On the other hand, cost estimates could be reduced by allowing for accelerated technological learning, or the possible use of carbon tax/emission permit revenues to reform national tax systems.

In most of the assessed studies, costs rose for increasingly stringent stabilization targets. In scenarios that had high baseline emissions, mitigation costs were generally higher for comparable stabilization targets. In scenarios with low emissions baselines, mitigation costs were generally lower for comparable stabilization targets.

This pie chart illustrates both total emissions for each income group, and emissions per person within each income group. For example, the 10% with the highest incomes are responsible for half of carbon emissions, and its members emit an average of more than five times as much per person as members of the lowest half of the income scale.

=== Regional costs of mitigation ===
Several studies have estimated regional mitigation costs. The conclusions of these studies are as follows:

- Regional abatement costs are largely dependent on the assumed stabilization level and baseline scenario. The allocation of emission allowances/permits is also an important factor, but for most countries, is less important than the stabilization level.
- Other costs arise from changes in international trade. Fossil fuel-exporting regions are likely to be affected by losses in coal and oil exports compared to baseline, while some regions might experience increased bio-energy (energy derived from biomass) exports.
- Allocation schemes based on current emissions (i.e., where the most allowances/permits are given to the largest current polluters, and the fewest allowances are given to smallest current polluters) lead to welfare losses for developing countries, while allocation schemes based on a per capita convergence of emissions (i.e., where per capita emissions are equalized) lead to welfare gains for developing countries.

=== Sharing of mitigation costs ===
There have been different proposals on how to allocate responsibility for cutting emissions:

- Egalitarianism: this system interprets the problem as one where each person has equal rights to a global resource, i.e., polluting the atmosphere.
- Basic needs: this system would have emissions allocated according to basic needs, as defined according to a minimum level of consumption. Consumption above basic needs would require countries to buy more emission rights. From this viewpoint, developing countries would need to be at least as well off under an emissions control regime as they would be outside the regime.
- Proportionality and polluter-pays principle: Proportionality reflects the ancient Aristotelian principle that people should receive in proportion to what they put in, and pay in proportion to the damages they cause. This has a potential relationship with the "polluter-pays principle", which can be interpreted in a number of ways:
  - Historical responsibilities: this asserts that allocation of emission rights should be based on patterns of past emissions. Two-thirds of the stock of GHGs in the atmosphere at present is due to the past actions of developed countries.
  - Comparable burdens and ability to pay: with this approach, countries would reduce emissions based on comparable burdens and their ability to take on the costs of reduction. Ways to assess burdens include monetary costs per head of population, as well as other, more complex measures, like the UNDP's Human Development Index.
  - Willingness to pay: with this approach, countries take on emission reductions based on their ability to pay along with how much they benefit from reducing their emissions.
- Equal per capita entitlements: this is the most widely cited method of distributing abatement costs, and is derived from egalitarianism. This approach can be divided into two categories. In the first category, emissions are allocated according to national population. In the second category, emissions are allocated in a way that attempts to account for historical (cumulative) emissions.
- Status quo: with this approach, historical emissions are ignored, and current emission levels are taken as a status quo right to emit. An analogy for this approach can be made with fisheries, which is a common, limited resource. The analogy would be with the atmosphere, which can be viewed as an exhaustible natural resource. In international law, one state recognized the long-established use of another state's use of the fisheries resource. It was also recognized by the state that part of the other state's economy was dependent on that resource.

== Costs of adaptation ==
Adaptation costs are the costs of planning, preparing for, facilitating and implementing adaptation. Adaptation benefits can be estimated in terms of reduced damages from the effects of climate change. In economic terms, the cost to benefit ratio of adaptation shows that each dollar can deliver large benefits. For example, it is estimated that every US$1 billion invested in adaptation against coastal flooding leads to a US$14 billion reduction in economic damages. Investing in more resilient infrastructure in developing countries would provide an average of $4 in benefit for each $1 invested. In other words, a small percentage increase in investment costs can mitigate the potentially very large disruption to infrastructure costs.

A 2023 study found the overall adaptation costs for all developing countries to be around US$215 billion per year for the period up to 2030. The highest adaptation expenses are for river flood protection, infrastructure and coastal protection. They also found that in most cases, adaptation costs will be significantly higher by 2050.

It is difficult to estimate both the costs of adaptation and the adaptation finance needs. The costs of adaptation varies with the objective and the level of adaptation required and what is acceptable as residual, i.e. 'unmanaged' risk. Similarly, adaptation finance needs vary depending on the overall adaptation plans for the country, city, or region. It also depends on the assessment methods used. A 2023 study analysed country-level information submitted to the UNFCCC in National Adaptation Plans and Nationally Determined Contributions (85 countries). It estimated global adaptation needs of developing countries annual average to be US$387 billion, for the period up to 2030.

Both the cost estimates and needs estimates have high uncertainty. Adaptation costs are usually derived from economic modelling analysis (global or sectoral models). Adaptation needs are based on programme and project-level costing. These programmes depend on the high level adaptation instrument – such as a plan, policy or strategy. For many developing countries, the implementation of certain actions specified in the plans is conditional on receiving international support. in these countries, a majority (85%) of finance needs are expected to be met from international public climate finance, i.e. funding from developed to developing countries. There is less data available for adaptation costs and adaptation finance needs in high income countries. Data show that per capita needs tend to increase with income level, but these countries can also afford to invest more domestically.

== Challenges and debates ==
=== Efficiency and equity ===
No consensus exists on who should bear the burden of adaptation and mitigation costs. Several different arguments have been made over how to spread the costs and benefits of taxes or systems based on emissions trading.

One approach considers the problem from the perspective of who benefits most from the public good. This approach is sensitive to the fact that different preferences exist between different income classes. The public good is viewed in a similar way as a private good, where those who use the public good must pay for it. Some people will benefit more from the public good than others, thus creating inequalities in the absence of benefit taxes. A difficulty with public goods is determining who exactly benefits from the public good, although some estimates of the distribution of the costs and benefits of global warming have been made – see above. Additionally, this approach does not provide guidance as to how the surplus of benefits from climate policy should be shared.

A second approach has been suggested based on economics and the social welfare function. To calculate the social welfare function requires an aggregation of the impacts of climate change policies and climate change itself across all affected individuals. This calculation involves a number of complexities and controversial equity issues. For example, the monetization of certain impacts on human health. There is also controversy over the issue of benefits affecting one individual offsetting negative impacts on another. These issues to do with equity and aggregation cannot be fully resolved by economics.

On a utilitarian basis, which has traditionally been used in welfare economics, an argument can be made for richer countries taking on most of the burdens of mitigation. However, another result is possible with a different modeling of impacts. If an approach is taken where the interests of poorer people have lower weighting, the result is that there is a much weaker argument in favour of mitigation action in rich countries. Valuing climate change impacts in poorer countries less than domestic climate change impacts (both in terms of policy and the impacts of climate change) would be consistent with observed spending in rich countries on foreign aid

A third approach looks at the problem from the perspective of who has contributed most to the problem. Because the industrialized countries have contributed more than two-thirds of the stock of human-induced GHGs in the atmosphere, this approach suggests that they should bear the largest share of the costs. This stock of emissions has been described as an "environmental debt". In terms of efficiency, this view is not supported. This is because efficiency requires incentives to be forward-looking, and not retrospective. The question of historical responsibility is a matter of ethics. It has been suggested that developed countries could address the issue by making side-payments to developing countries.

A 2019 modelling study found climate change had contributed towards global economic inequality. Wealthy countries in colder regions had either felt little overall economic impact from climate change, or possibly benefited, whereas poor hotter countries very likely grew less than if global warming had not occurred. Part of this observation stems from the fact that greenhouse gas emissions come mainly from high-income countries, while low-income countries are affected by it negatively. So, high-income countries are producing significant amounts of emissions, but the impacts are unequally threatening low-income countries, who do not have access to the resources to recover from such impacts. This further deepens the inequalities within the poor and the rich, hindering sustainability efforts. Impacts of climate change could even push millions of people into poverty.

=== Insurance and markets ===
Traditional insurance works by transferring risk to those better able or more willing to bear risk, and also by the pooling of risk. Since the risks of climate change are, to some extent, correlated, this reduces the effectiveness of pooling. However, there is reason to believe that different regions will be affected differently by climate change. This suggests that pooling might be effective. Since developing countries appear to be potentially most at risk from the effects of climate change, developed countries could provide insurance against these risks.

Disease, rising seas, reduced crop yields, and other harms driven by climate change will likely have a major deleterious impact on the economy by 2050 unless the world sharply reduces greenhouse gas emissions in the near term, according to a number of studies, including a study by the Carbon Disclosure Project and a study by insurance giant Swiss Re. The Swiss Re assessment found that annual output by the world economy will be reduced by $23 trillion annually, unless greenhouse gas emissions are adequately mitigated. As a consequence, according to the Swiss Re study, climate change will impact how the insurance industry prices a variety of risks.

=== Effects of economic growth and degrowth scenarios on emissions ===
The emissions of the richest 1% of the global population account for more than twice the combined share of the poorest 50%. Compliance with the 1.5 °C goal of the Paris Agreement would require the richest 1% to reduce their current emissions by at least a factor of 30, while per-person emissions of the poorest 50% could increase by a factor of about three.

Though total CO_{2} emissions (size of pie charts) differ substantially among high-emitting regions, the pattern of higher income classes emitting more than lower income classes is consistent across regions. The world's top 1% of emitters emit over 1000 times more than the bottom 1%.

Economic growth is one of the causes of increasing greenhouse gas emissions. As the economy expands, demand for energy and energy-intensive goods increases, pushing up CO_{2} emissions. On the other hand, economic growth may drive technological change and increase energy efficiency. Economic growth may be associated with specialization in certain economic sectors. If specialization is in energy-intensive sectors, then there will be a strong link between economic growth and emissions growth. If specialization is in less energy-intensive sectors, e.g. the services sector, then there might be a weak link between economic growth and emissions growth. In general, there is some degree of flexibility between economic growth and emissions growth.

Some studies found that degrowth scenarios, where economic output either declines or declines in terms of contemporary economic metrics such as current GDP, have been neglected in considerations of 1.5 °C scenarios reported by the Intergovernmental Panel on Climate Change (IPCC). They find that some degrowth scenarios "minimize many key risks for feasibility and sustainability compared to technology-driven pathways" with a core problem of such being feasibility in the context of contemporary decision-making of politics and globalized rebound- and relocation-effects. This is supported by other studies which state that absolute decoupling is highly unlikely to be achieved fast enough to prevent global warming over 1.5 °C or 2 °C, even under optimistic policy conditions.

== Economics of climate change mitigation ==
Companies, governments and households have committed increasing amounts to decarbonization, including renewable energy (solar, wind), electric vehicles and associated charging infrastructure, energy storage, energy-efficient heating systems, carbon capture and storage, and hydrogen.

The economics of climate change mitigation is a contentious part of climate change mitigation – action aimed to limit the dangerous socio-economic and environmental consequences of climate change. Climate change mitigation centres on two main strategies: the reduction of greenhouse gas (GHG) emissions and the preservation and expansion of sinks which absorb greenhouse gases, including the sea and forests.

=== Policies and approaches to reduce emissions ===
==== Price signals ====
A carbon price is a system of applying a price to carbon emissions, as a method of emissions mitigation. Potential methods of pricing include carbon emission trading, results-based climate finance, crediting mechanisms and more. Carbon pricing can lend itself to the creation of carbon taxes, which allows governments to tax emissions.

Carbon taxes are considered useful because, once a number has been created, it will benefit the government either with currency or with a lowering in emissions or both, and therefore benefit the environment. It is almost a consensus that carbon taxing is the most cost-effective method of having a substantial and rapid response to climate change and carbon emissions. However, backlash to the tax includes that it can be considered regressive, as the impact can be damaging disproportionately to the poor who spend much of their income on energy for their homes. Still, even with near universal approval, there are issues regarding both the collection and redistribution of the taxes. One of the central questions being how the newly collected taxes will be redistributed.

Some or all of the proceeds of a carbon tax can be used to stop it disadvantaging the poor.

==== Structural market reforms ====
In addition to the implementation of command-and-control regulations (as with a carbon tax), governments can also use market-based approaches to mitigate emissions. One such method is emissions trading where governments set the total emissions of all polluters to a maximum and distribute permits, through auction or allocation, that allow entities to emit a portion, typically one ton of carbon dioxide equivalent (CO_{2}e), of the mandated total emissions. In other words, the amount of pollution an entity can emit in an emissions trading system is limited by the number of permits they have. If a polluter wants to increase their emissions, they can only do so after buying permits from those who are willing to sell them. Many economists prefer this method of reducing emissions as it is market based and highly cost effective. That being said, emissions trading alone is not perfect since it fails to place a clear price on emissions. Without this price, emissions prices are volatile due to the supply of permits being fixed, meaning their price is entirely determined by shifts in demand.

This uncertainty in price is especially disliked by businesses since it prevents them from investing in abatement technologies with confidence which hinders efforts for mitigating emissions. Regardless, while emissions trading alone has its problems and cannot reduce pollutants to the point of stabilizing the global climate, it remains an important tool for addressing climate change.

==== Degrowth ====
There is a debate about a potentially critical need for new ways of economic accounting, including directly monitoring and quantifying positive real-world environmental effects such as air quality improvements and related unprofitable work like forest protection, alongside far-reaching structural changes of lifestyles as well as acknowledging and moving beyond the limits of current economics such as GDP. Some argue that for effective climate change mitigation degrowth has to occur, while some argue that eco-economic decoupling could limit climate change enough while continuing high rates of traditional GDP growth. There is also research and debate about requirements of how economic systems could be transformed for sustainability – such as how their jobs could transition harmoniously into green jobs – a just transition – and how relevant sectors of the economy – like the renewable energy industry and the bioeconomy – could be adequately supported.

While degrowth is often believed to be associated with decreased living standards and austerity measures, many of its proponents seek to expand universal public goods (such as public transport), increase health (fitness, wellbeing and freedom from diseases) and increase various forms of, often unconventional commons-oriented, labor. To this end, the application of both advanced technologies and reductions in various demands, including via overall reduced labor time or sufficiency-oriented strategies, are considered to be important by some.

=== Assessing costs and benefits ===
==== GDP ====
The costs of mitigation and adaptation policies can be measured as a percentage of GDP. A problem with this method of assessing costs is that GDP is an imperfect measure of welfare. There are externalities in the economy which mean that some prices might not be truly reflective of their social costs.

Corrections can be made to GDP estimates to allow for these problems, but they are difficult to calculate. In response to this problem, some have suggested using other methods to assess policy. For example, the United Nations Commission for Sustainable Development has developed a system for "Green" GDP accounting and a list of sustainable development indicators.

==== Baselines ====
The emissions baseline is, by definition, the emissions that would occur in the absence of policy intervention. Definition of the baseline scenario is critical in the assessment of mitigation costs. This because the baseline determines the potential for emissions reductions, and the costs of implementing emission reduction policies.

There are several concepts used in the literature over baselines, including the "efficient" and "business-as-usual" (BAU) baseline cases. In the efficient baseline, it is assumed that all resources are being employed efficiently. In the BAU case, it is assumed that future development trends follow those of the past, and no changes in policies will take place. The BAU baseline is often associated with high GHG emissions, and may reflect the continuation of current energy-subsidy policies, or other market failures.

Some high emission BAU baselines imply relatively low net mitigation costs per unit of emissions. If the BAU scenario projects a large growth in emissions, total mitigation costs can be relatively high. Conversely, in an efficient baseline, mitigation costs per unit of emissions can be relatively high, but total mitigation costs low.

==== Ancillary impacts ====
These are the secondary or side effects of mitigation policies, and including them in studies can result in higher or lower mitigation cost estimates. Reduced mortality and morbidity costs are potentially a major ancillary benefit of mitigation. This benefit is associated with reduced use of fossil fuels, thereby resulting in less air pollution, which might even just by itself be a benefit greater than the cost. There may also be ancillary costs.

==== Flexibility ====
Flexibility is the ability to reduce emissions at the lowest cost. The greater the flexibility that governments allow in their regulatory framework to reduce emissions, the lower the potential costs are for achieving emissions reductions (Markandya et al., 2001:455).

- "Where" flexibility allows costs to be reduced by allowing emissions to be cut at locations where it is most efficient to do so. For example, the Flexibility Mechanisms of the Kyoto Protocol allow "where" flexibility (Toth et al., 2001:660).
- "When" flexibility potentially lowers costs by allowing reductions to be made at a time when it is most efficient to do so.

Including carbon sinks in a policy framework is another source of flexibility. Tree planting and forestry management actions can increase the capacity of sinks. Soils and other types of vegetation are also potential sinks. There is, however, uncertainty over how net emissions are affected by activities in this area.

==== Discount rates ====
Assessing climate change impacts and mitigation policies involves a comparison of economic flows that occur in different points in time. The discount rate is used by economists to compare economic effects occurring at different times. Discounting converts future economic impacts into their present-day value. The discount rate is generally positive because resources invested today can, on average, be transformed into more resources later. If climate change mitigation is viewed as an investment, then the return on investment can be used to decide how much should be spent on mitigation.

Integrated assessment models (IAM) are used to estimate the social cost of carbon. The discount rate is one of the factors used in these models. The IAM frequently used is the Dynamic Integrated Climate-Economy (DICE) model developed by William Nordhaus. The DICE model uses discount rates, uncertainty, and risks to make benefit and cost estimations of climate policies and adapt to the current economic behavior.

The choice of discount rate has a large effect on the result of any climate change cost analysis (Halsnæs et al., 2007:136). Using too high a discount rate will result in too little investment in mitigation, but using too low a rate will result in too much investment in mitigation. In other words, a high discount rate implies that the present-value of a dollar is worth more than the future-value of a dollar.

Discounting can either be prescriptive or descriptive. The descriptive approach is based on what discount rates are observed in the behaviour of people making every day decisions (the private discount rate) (IPCC, 2007c:813). In the prescriptive approach, a discount rate is chosen based on what is thought to be in the best interests of future generations (the social discount rate).

The descriptive approach can be interpreted as an effort to maximize the economic resources available to future generations, allowing them to decide how to use those resources. The prescriptive approach can be interpreted as an effort to do as much as is economically justified to reduce the risk of climate change.

The DICE model incorporates a descriptive approach, in which discounting reflects actual economic conditions. In a recent DICE model, DICE-2013R Model, the social cost of carbon is estimated based on the following alternative scenarios: (1) a baseline scenario, when climate change policies have not changed since 2010, (2) an optimal scenario, when climate change policies are optimal (fully implemented and followed), (3) when the optimal scenario does not exceed 2˚C limit after 1900 data, (4) when the 2˚C limit is an average and not the optimum, (5) when a near-zero (low) discount rate of 0.1% is used (as assumed in the Stern Review), (6) when a near-zero discount rate is also used but with calibrated interest rates, and (7) when a high discount rate of 3.5% is used.

According to Markandya et al. (2001), discount rates used in assessing mitigation programmes need to at least partly reflect the opportunity costs of capital. In developed countries, Markandya et al. thought that a discount rate of around 4–6% was probably justified, while in developing countries, a rate of 10–12% was cited. The discount rates used in assessing private projects were found to be higher – with potential rates of between 10% and 25%.

When deciding how to discount future climate change impacts, value judgements are necessary. IPCC (2001a:9) found that there was no consensus on the use of long-term discount rates in this area. The prescriptive approach to discounting leads to long-term discount rates of 2–3% in real terms, while the descriptive approach leads to rates of at least 4% after tax – sometimes much higher (Halsnæs et al., 2007:136).

Even today, it is difficult to agree on an appropriate discount rate. The approach of discounting to be either prescriptive or descriptive stemmed from the views of Nordhaus and Stern. Nordhaus takes on a descriptive approach which "assumes that investments to slow climate change must compete with investments in other areas". While Stern takes on a prescriptive approach in which "leads to the conclusion that any positive pure rate of time preference is unethical".

In Nordhaus' view, his descriptive approach translates that the impact of climate change is slow, thus investments in climate change should be on the same level of competition with other investments. He defines the discount rate to be the rate of return on capital investments. The DICE model uses the estimated market return on capital as the discount rate, around an average of 4%. He argues that a higher discount rate will make future damages look small, thus have less effort to reduce emissions today. A lower discount rate will make future damages look larger, thus put more effort to reduce emissions today.

In Stern's view, the pure rate of time preference is defined as the discount rate in a scenario where present and future generations have equal resources and opportunities. A zero pure rate of time preference in this case would indicate that all generations are treated equally. The future generation do not have a "voice" on today's current policies, so the present generation are morally responsible to treat the future generation in the same manner. He suggests for a lower discount rate in which the present generation should invest in the future to reduce the risks of climate change.

Assumptions are made to support estimating high and low discount rates. These estimates depend on future emissions, climate sensitivity relative to increase in greenhouse gas concentrations, and the seriousness of impacts over time. Long-term climate policies will significantly impact future generations and this is called intergenerational discounting. Factors that make intergenerational discounting complicated include the great uncertainty of economic growth, future generations are affected by today's policies, and private discounting will be affected due to a longer "investment horizon".

Discounting is a relatively controversial issue in both climate change mitigation and environmental economics due to the ethical implications of valuing future generations less than present ones. Non-economists often find it difficult to grapple with the idea that thousands of dollars of future costs and benefits can be valued at less than a cent in the present after discounting.

=== Economic barriers to addressing climate change mitigation ===
Economic components like the stock market underestimate or cannot value social benefits of climate change mitigation. Climate change is largely an externality, despite a limited recent internalization of impacts that previously were fully 'external' to the economy.

Consumers can be affected by policies that relate to e.g. ethical consumer literacy, the available choices they have, transportation policy, product transparency policies, and larger-order economic policies that for example facilitate large-scale shifts of jobs. Such policies or measures are sometimes unpopular with the population. Therefore, they may be difficult for politicians to enact directly or help facilitate indirectly.

Climate policies-induced future lost financial profits from global stranded fossil-fuel assets would lead to major losses for freely managed wealth of investors in advanced economies in current economics.

== See also ==
- Circular economy
- Climate change and poverty
- Climate justice
- Climate security
- Ecological economics
- Effects of climate change on agriculture
- Effects of climate change on livestock
- Energy transition
- Environmental economics
- Environmental justice
- European Green Deal
- Green economy
