= Bettina Hörstrup =

German Lawyer

Bettina Hörstrup (born 1968 in Rheinberg as Bettina Ettwig) is a German lawyer and administrative director of the Potsdam Institute for Climate Impact Research (PIK) since 2020. Together with the scientific directors Ottmar Edenhofer and Johan Rockström, she forms the board of the Potsdam Institute for Climate Impact Research.

== Career ==
Bettina Hörstrup studied law in Bonn and completed her legal clerkship at the Regional Court of Cologne. She completed her doctorate under Prof. Meinhard Heinze on the subject of "Dismissal for operational reasons in insolvency". At the same time, she worked as a freelance lawyer in Berlin. Subsequently, in 1997, Hörstrup took up a position as legal advisor and assistant to the administrative director at the Helmholtz Centre Potsdam - GFZ German Research Centre for Geosciences. Two years later, she moved to the central administration of the trading group McPaper AG as deputy head of the legal department. In 2001, she returned to the GFZ as Head of the Human Resources Department and, from 2005, was also Deputy to the Administrative Director. From 2006 to 2008, Bettina Hörstrup was Chairwoman of the Helmholtz Association's Personnel Committee.

In 2011, she received the Master of Management from Malik Management Zentrum St. Gallen, Switzerland.

Since August 2020, she is the first Administrative Director at PIK.

In 2023 Bettina Hörstrup was appointed to the Advisory Board of the Leibniz Centre for Tropical Marine Research (ZMT).

== Publications ==
- Bettina Ettwig: Die betriebsbedingte Kündigung in der Insolvenz. Luchterhand Verlag, 2000. ISBN 3-472-04009-2, ISBN 978-3-472-04009-5 (German)
- SAE (Sammlung Arbeitsrechtlicher Entscheidungen) Maßgebliche Kündigungsfrist im Konkurs und in der Insolvenz – Besprechung des Urteils des BAG vom 19.01.2000 – 4 AZR 70/99 (Bettina Ettwig) (German)
