= NGFS =

NGFS may refer to:

- Naval gunfire support
- New Garden Friends School
- Network for Greening the Financial System
