= Johan Rockström =

Swedish professor (born 1965)

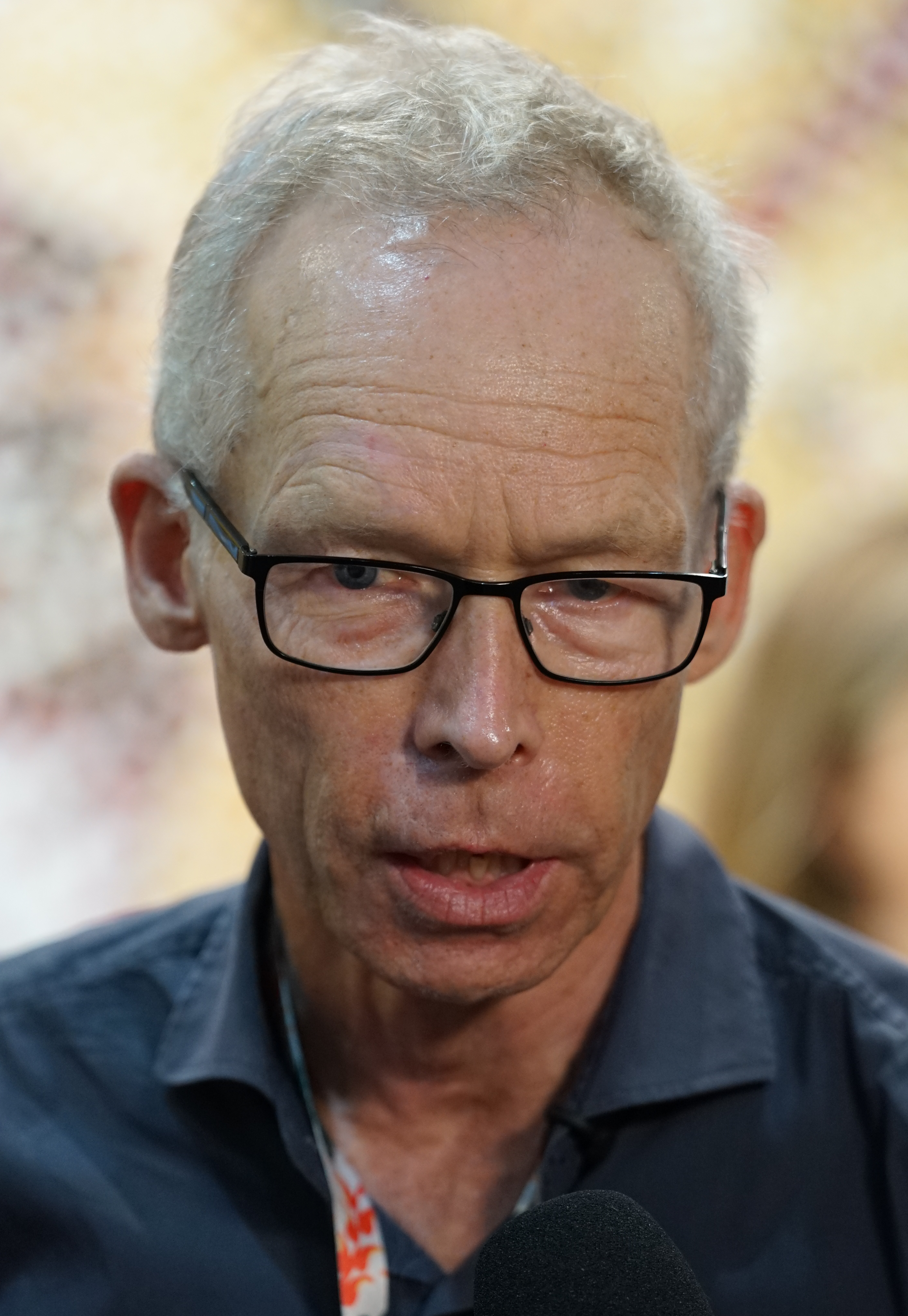
- Rockström at COP30 in 2025
- Born: 31 December 1965 (age 60)
- Education: Swedish University of Agricultural Sciences; Stockholm University (PhD, 1997)
- Known for: Leading development on the Planetary Boundaries framework
- Awards: International Cosmos Prize (2015); German Environmental Prize (2015); Hillary Laureate (2017); Laureate, Prince Albert II of Monaco Foundation Award (2020)
- Scientific career
- Fields: Global sustainability and water resources
- Workplaces: Stockholm University; Stockholm Resilience Centre; Potsdam Institute for Climate Impact Research

Johan Rockström (born 31 December 1965) is a Swedish scientist, internationally recognized for his work on global sustainability issues. He is joint director of the Potsdam Institute for Climate Impact Research (PIK) in Germany, together with economist Ottmar Edenhofer. Rockström is also chief scientist at Conservation International. He is Professor in Earth System Science at the University of Potsdam and Professor in Water Systems and Global Sustainability, Stockholm University.

Rockström has pioneered work on the planetary boundaries framework, first published in 2009. The nine planetary boundaries presented in the framework, from climate to biodiversity, are argued to be fundamental in maintaining a "safe operating space for humanity."

Rockström was executive director of the Stockholm Environment Institute from 2004–2012, and director of the Stockholm Resilience Centre from 2007–2018.

== Career ==
Johan Rockström studied at the Swedish University of Agricultural Sciences in Uppsala (soil science and hydrology) and at the Institut national agronomique in Paris (agriculture) from 1987 to 1991. He received his Ph.D. in 1997 from Stockholm University, where his research was on "Systems Ecology and Natural Resource Management." Rockström's previous scientific work has included inter- and transdisciplinary topics on global water resources and land use management, as well as socio-ecological resilience and global material cycles.

In 2009, Rockström led the team that developed the Planetary Boundaries framework, a proposed precondition for facilitating human development at a time when the planet is undergoing rapid change. In recognition of this work, Fokus magazine named him "Swede of the Year" for "engaging and exciting work in sustainable development. In 2010, the magazine Miljöaktuellt ranked him the second most influential person in Sweden on environmental issues, and Veckans Affärer gave him its "Social Capitalist Award". In 2011 he chaired the third Nobel Laureate Symposium on Global Sustainability in Stockholm.

After 12 years as director of Stockholm Resilience Centre (SRC), he became the 2018 joint director of the Potsdam Institute for Climate Impact Research (PIK), based in Germany, with PIK's current deputy director Professor Ottmar Edenhofer, a climate economist. Rockström and Edenhofer follow PIK director Professor Hans Joachim Schellnhuber. He is currently member of the Board of the EAT Foundation, the Global Challenges Foundation, a fellow for Earth League as well as co-chair of Future Earth and Earth Commission.

In 2020 he became a member of the German Academy of Sciences Leopoldina. In 2021, together with David Attenborough, Rockström appeared in the Netflix documentary "Breaking Boundaries" and also released a book called Breaking Boundaries: The Science Behind our Planet.

He has acted as speaker to various high-level international meetings and organisations, such as the World Economic Forum, the General Assembly of the United Nations (UNGA), the United Nations Sustainable Development Solutions Network (SDSN) and the United Nations Framework Convention on Climate Change Conferences (UNFCCC). Moreover, he is a member of the European Investment Bank Advisory Group.

If we have any chance to prevent the loss of more than a million species, we must halt biodiversity loss now, not in 20 or 30 years. If we want to have any chance of keeping global warming to 1.5C, we need to cut emissions by half over the next nine years.

— Rockström, 2021

== Awards ==
- 2009 Swedish Person of the Year, by the journal Fokus, for bridging science and society
- 2013 Agronomist of the Year, Agronomist Association (Swedish Association of Professional Scientists)
- 2014 Woods Hole Research Center's Lawrence S. Huntington Environmental Prize
- 2015 International Cosmos Prize
- 2015 German Environmental Prize
- 2020 Laureate, Prince Albert II of Monaco Foundation Award
- 2023 Public Value Award
- 2024 Tyler Prize for Environmental Achievement
- 2024 The Virchow Prize, honored jointly with Lucy Gilson for "their holistic and systems-based approach safeguarding human and planetary health"
- 2023 TIME100 Most Influential People in the World
- 2024 ETH Zurich Chemical Engineering Medal

== Planetary boundaries ==
In 2009, Rockström led an international group of 28 leading academics, who proposed a new Earth system framework for government and management agencies as a precondition for sustainable development. Recognizing that rising human pressures on climate and nature have the potential to destabilize the entire Earth system, the framework posits that Earth system processes on the planet have boundaries or thresholds that should not be crossed. Staying within the safe operating space for humanity. delimited by the planetary boundaries safeguards the stable environmental conditions that made the emergence of modern societies possible in the first place and will allow coming generations to develop and thrive. The group identified nine "planetary life support systems" essential for human well-being and attempted to quantify just how far these systems have been pushed already. They then estimated how much further we could go before the risk of "irreversible and abrupt environmental change" which could make Earth less habitable increases. Boundaries can help identify where there is room and define a "safe space for human development", which is an improvement over approaches that aim to minimize human impacts on the planet. Humanity has already transgressed five of the nine planetary boundaries putting the prospects of long-term, equitable human development at risk if permanently and substantially exceeded.

According to critics, the exact location of six of these "planetary boundaries" are not proven but arbitrary, such as the 15% limit of earth use to cropland. They are also connected to local rather than global consequences. The planetary boundaries framework is not a static concept, but requires constant development to reflect progress in its scientific foundation and address the constructive debates around the framework. A broader scientific and conceptual update of the planetary boundaries was published in 2015. More recent publications focused on improving quantifications of individual boundaries, translating global to regional boundaries, interconnections and feedbacks between planetary boundaries, and the quantification of hitherto uncertain boundaries.

== Publications (selection) ==
=== Books ===
- Johan Rockström et al.: Breaking Boundaries: The Science Behind our Planet. DK, 2021, ISBN 978-0-241-46675-9
- Johan Rockström et al.: Eat Good – Das Kochbuch, das die Welt verändert. Hildesheim 2019, ISBN 978-3-8369-2158-9.
- Anders Wijkman, Johan Rockström (2012), Bankrupting Nature: Denying Our Planetary Boundaries (in German), Taylor & Francis, ISBN 978-0-415-53969-2
- Malin Falkenmark, Johan Rockström (2004), Balancing Water for Humans and Nature: The New Approach in Ecohydrology (in German), Earthscan, ISBN 978-1-85383-927-6

=== Contributions to journals ===
- Rockström, J., Gupta, J., Lenton, T. M., Qin, D., Lade, S. J., Abrams, J. F., Jacobson, L., Rocha, J.C., Zimm, C., Bai, X., Bala, G., Bringezu, S., Broadgate, W., Bunn, S.E., DeClerck, F., Ebi, K.L., Gong, P., Gordon, C., Kanie, N., Liverman, D., Nakicenovic, N., Obura, D., Ramanthan, V., Verburg, P.H., van Vuuren, D.P., Winkelmann, R. (2021). Identifying a safe and just corridor for people and the planet. Earth's Future, 9. | 10.1029/2020EF001866
- Gerten, D.; Heck, V.; Jägermeyr, J.; Bodirsky, B.L.; Fetzer, I.; Jalava, M.; Kummu, M.; Lucht, W.; Rockström, J.; Schaphoff, S.; Schellnhuber, H.J. (2020). Feeding ten billion people is possible within four terrestrial planetary boundaries. Nature Sustainability
- Lenton, T.M., Rockström, J., Gaffney, O., Rahmstorf, S., Richardson, K., Steffen, W., Schellnhuber, H.J. (2019). Climate tipping points - too risky to bet against. Nature Vol 575, pages 592-595.
- Willett, W., Rockström, J., Loken, B., Springmann, M., et al. 2019. Food in the Anthropocene: the EAT–Lancet Commission on healthy diets from sustainable food systems. EAT-Lancet Commission on healthy diets from sustainable food systems, DOI: 10.1016/S0140-6736(18)31788-4
- Sachs, J. D., Schmidt-Traub, G., Mazzucato, M., Messner, D., Nakicenovic, N., Rockström, J.(2019). Six Transformations to achieve the Sustainable Development Goals. Nature Sustainability, DOI 10.1038/s41893-019-0352-9.
- Steffen, W., J. Rockstrom, K. Richardson, T. M. Lenton, C. Folke, D. Liverman, C. P. Summerhayes, A. D. Barnosky, S. E. Cornell, M. Crucifix, J. F. Donges, I. Fetzer, S. J. Lade, M. Scheffer, R. Winkelmann, H. J. Schellnhuber. 2018. Trajectories of the Earth System in the Athropocene. Proceedings of the National Academy of Sciences of the United States of America 115 (33): 8252-8259.
- Rockström, J., Gaffney, O., Rogelj, J. et al. 2017. A roadmap for rapid decarbonization. Science, Volume 355 Issue 6331: 1269-1271.
- Figueres, C., H.J. Schellnhuber, G. Whiteman, J. Rockström, A. Hobley, S. Rahmstorf. 2017. Three years to safeguard our climate. Nature 546: 593-595.
- Rockström, Johan; Gaffney, Owen; Rogelj, Joeri; Meinshausen, Malte; Nakicenovic, Nebojsa; Schellnhuber, Hans Joachim (24 March 2017). "A roadmap for rapid decarbonization" (PDF). Science. 355 (6331). American Association for the Advancement of Science (AAAS): 1269–1271. Bibcode:2017Sci...355.1269R. doi:10.1126/science.aah3443. ISSN 0036-8075. PMID 28336628. S2CID 36453591.
- Rockström, Johan; Williams, John; Daily, Gretchen; Noble, Andrew; Matthews, Nathanial; Gordon, Line; Wetterstrand, Hanna; DeClerck, Fabrice; Shah, Mihir; Steduto, Pasquale; de Fraiture, Charlotte; Hatibu, Nuhu; Unver, Olcay; Bird, Jeremy; Sibanda, Lindiwe; Smith, Jimmy (12 July 2016). "Sustainable intensification of agriculture for human prosperity and global sustainability". Ambio. 46 (1). Springer Science and Business Media LLC: 4–17. doi:10.1007/s13280-016-0793-6. ISSN 0044-7447. PMC 5226894. PMID 27405653.
- Rockström J, L Karlberg and M Falkenmark (2011) "Global Food Production in a water-constrained world: exploring 'green' and 'blue' challenges and solutions." In Grafton, R. Q. and K. Hussey (eds.) 2011. Water Resources Planning and Management. Cambridge University Press.
- Rockström J and L Karlberg (2010) The quadruple squeeze: Defining the safe operating space for freshwater use to achieve a triply green revolution in the Anthropocene. Ambio, 39(3): 257–265. doi:10.1007/s13280-010-0033-4
- Hoff H, M Falkenmark, D Gerten, L Gordon, L Karlberg and J Rockström (eds.) (2010) Journal of Hydrology: Green-Blue Water Initiative (GBI), 384(3/4): 175–306.
- Enfors, Elin; Barron, Jennie; Makurira, Hodson; Rockström, Johan; Tumbo, Siza (2011). "Yield and soil system changes from conservation tillage in dryland farming: A case study from North Eastern Tanzania". Agricultural Water Management. 98 (11). Elsevier BV: 1687–1695. Bibcode:2011AgWM...98.1687E. doi:10.1016/j.agwat.2010.02.013. ISSN 0378-3774.
- Reid, W. V.; Chen, D.; Goldfarb, L.; Hackmann, H.; Lee, Y. T.; Mokhele, K.; Ostrom, E.; Raivio, K.; Rockstrom, J.; Schellnhuber, H. J.; Whyte, A. (11 November 2010). "Earth System Science for Global Sustainability: Grand Challenges". Science. 330 (6006). American Association for the Advancement of Science (AAAS): 916–917. Bibcode:2010Sci...330..916R. doi:10.1126/science.1196263. ISSN 0036-8075. PMID 21071651. S2CID 39302849.
- Kijne, J, J Barron, H Hoff, J Rockström, L Karlberg, J Gowing, SP Wani, D Wichelns (2009) Opportunities to increase water productivity in agriculture with special reference to Africa and South Asia. Stockholm: SEI. SEI project report.
- Hoff, H.; Falkenmark, M.; Gerten, D.; Gordon, L.; Karlberg, L.; Rockström, J. (2010). "Greening the global water system". Journal of Hydrology. 384 (3–4). Elsevier BV: 177–186. Bibcode:2010JHyd..384..177H. doi:10.1016/j.jhydrol.2009.06.026. ISSN 0022-1694.
- Wani SP, Rockström J and Oweis TY (2009) Rainfed agriculture: unlocking the potential CABI. ISBN 978-1-84593-389-0.
- Rockström, Johan; Falkenmark, Malin; Karlberg, Louise; Hoff, Holger; Rost, Stefanie; Gerten, Dieter (14 February 2009). "Future water availability for global food production: The potential of green water for increasing resilience to global change". Water Resources Research. 45 (7). American Geophysical Union (AGU). Bibcode:2009WRR....45.0A12R. doi:10.1029/2007wr006767. ISSN 0043-1397. S2CID 58887417.
- Rost, Stefanie; Gerten, Dieter; Hoff, Holger; Lucht, Wolfgang; Falkenmark, Malin; Rockström, Johan (9 October 2009). "Global potential to increase crop production through water management in rainfed agriculture". Environmental Research Letters. 4 (4) 044002. IOP Publishing. Bibcode:2009ERL.....4d4002R. doi:10.1088/1748-9326/4/4/044002. ISSN 1748-9326. S2CID 155033786.
- Kartha S, Siebert CK, Mathur R, Nakicenovic N, Ramanathan V, Rockström J, Schellnhuber HJ, Srivastava L and Watt R (2009) A Copenhagen Prognosis: towards a safe climate future Stockholm Environment Institute.
- Rockström, Johan; Steffen, Will; Noone, Kevin; Persson, Åsa; Chapin, F. Stuart; Lambin, Eric F.; Lenton, Timothy M.; Scheffer, Marten; Folke, Carl; Schellnhuber, Hans Joachim; Nykvist, Björn; de Wit, Cynthia A.; Hughes, Terry; van der Leeuw, Sander; Rodhe, Henning; Sörlin, Sverker; Snyder, Peter K.; Costanza, Robert; Svedin, Uno; Falkenmark, Malin; Karlberg, Louise; Corell, Robert W.; Fabry, Victoria J.; Hansen, James; Walker, Brian; Liverman, Diana; Richardson, Katherine; Crutzen, Paul; Foley, Jonathan A. (2009). "A safe operating space for humanity". Nature. 461 (7263). Springer Science and Business Media LLC: 472–475. Bibcode:2009Natur.461..472R. doi:10.1038/461472a. ISSN 0028-0836. PMID 19779433. S2CID 205049746.
- Rockström J, Vohland K, Lucht W, Lotze-Campen H, von Weizsäcker EU and Tariq Banuri T (2007) "Making progress within and beyond borders" In: Schellnhuber H-J, Stern N and Molina M (eds) Global sustainability: a Nobel cause, Chapter 4, pages 33–48. Cambridge University Press, 2010. ISBN 978-0-521-76934-1.
- Rockström, Johan. "Bounding the Planetary Future: Why We Need a Great Transition." Great Transition Initiative (April 2015), https://www.greattransition.org/publication/bounding-the-planetary-future-why-we-need-a-great-transition.
- Falkenmark M and Rockström J (2004) Balancing water for humans and nature: the new approach in ecohydrology Earthscan. ISBN 978-1-85383-927-6
- Rockström, Johan (2011). Den stora förnekelsen (in Swedish). Stockholm: Medströms Bokförlag. ISBN 978-91-7329-042-5. OCLC 792795683.
