= Mercator Research Institute on Global Commons and Climate Change =

German scientific institute

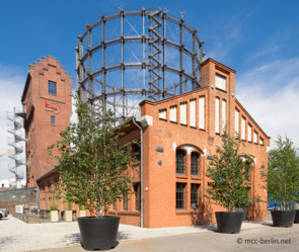
- MCC located at the EUREF-Building, Berlin
- Other names: MCC
- Type: Economic research, social sciences
- Established: 2012 (14 years ago)
- Founders: Stiftung Mercator; Potsdam Institute for Climate Impact Research
- Director: Ottmar Edenhofer
- Academic staff: circa 50
- Location: Berlin, Germany
- Website: www.mcc-berlin.net

The Mercator Research Institute on Global Commons and Climate Change (MCC) conducts research and fosters dialogue about how the global commons, such as the atmosphere and the oceans, might be used and shared by many yet nevertheless be protected. In 2021, the International Center for Climate Governance ranked MCC among the top ten think tanks worldwide for the fourth consecutive year.

== Organization ==
Based in Berlin, the institute was founded in 2012 by Stiftung Mercator and the Potsdam Institute for Climate Impact Research (PIK). The research team is composed of an interdisciplinary group of scientists from economics and the social sciences. Directed by the climate economist Ottmar Edenhofer, MCC currently employs some 50 staff. In 2015 the MCC was designated as the world's second best climate think tank.

== Work ==
The work of MCC falls into two main areas: research and policy dialogue. The aim is to gain interdisciplinary insights and to provide a basis for decision-making in politics, industry and civil society. The theme spanning across all the work is the global commons (i.e., natural resources such as the atmosphere, land, oceans and forests) and the premise that international cooperation is indispensable for the sustainable use of the commons.

For example, when the atmosphere is understood as a global commons, it is seen to belong to everybody despite its physical presence at the national, local and regional levels. In this case, overarching rules are needed to prevent this resource from being overused (see "tragedy of the commons"). Other examples include the overfishing of the oceans or the exploitation of wildlife.

The lack of availability of public goods, which provide access to health care, education, clean water and much more, the so-called social commons, comprises a core focus of the work of MCC. Based on scientific findings, potential solutions are identified, evaluated and provided.

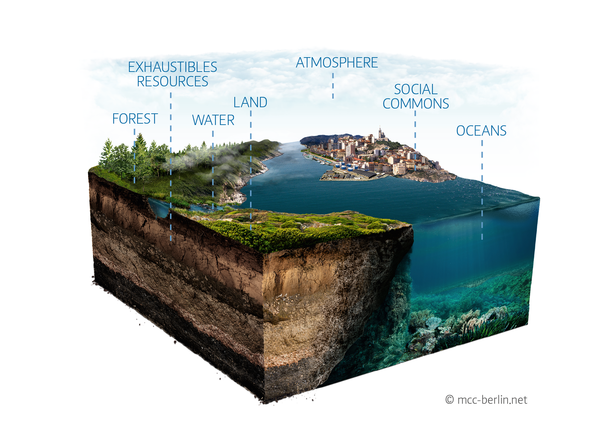
The global commons (Source: MCC)

=== Research ===
The research of MCC is divided into seven working groups and one task force:

- Economic growth and human development: Analysis of the relationships between economic growth, greenhouse gas emissions and resource consumption.
- Land use and urbanization: Investigation of the relationships between urbanization and global environmental changes, especially the sustainable development of cities from a social and ecological perspective.
- Sustainable resource management and global change: Analysis of possible solutions for sustainable resource management and the provision of public goods.
- Polycentric governance: Study of the institutional preconditions for achieving the 2 °C target, including of the instruments allowing for the prompt adoption of a sustainable climate policy.
- Scientific assessments, ethics and politics: Evaluation with respect to the handling of ethical aspects and diverse interests in integrated environment-related policy assessments.
- Geographic production and consumption patterns: Analysis of geographic production and consumption patterns as well as of the extraction and trade of raw materials in the global economy, and the visualization thereof.
- Climate change and development: The importance of expanding industrial structures and infrastructure for economic development and the resulting climate-related dependencies.
- Task Force "Public Economics for the Global Commons": Identification of implementable political measures for achieving an efficient and fair access to the global commons.

In addition to scientific research, policy advice is central to the work of MCC. Moreover, these two focal points build on each other and give rise to a self-perpetuating cycle: The scientific research findings form the basis of the consulting work ("policy dialogue"), while the consulting becomes the subject of research in that it is subjected to scientific evaluation.

=== Policy dialogue ===
Climate protection and sustainable development are areas that are intricately interwoven over the long term. For example, using biomass to produce "clean" energy to limit global warming could potentially result in increasing deforestation, biodiversity loss or rising food prices.

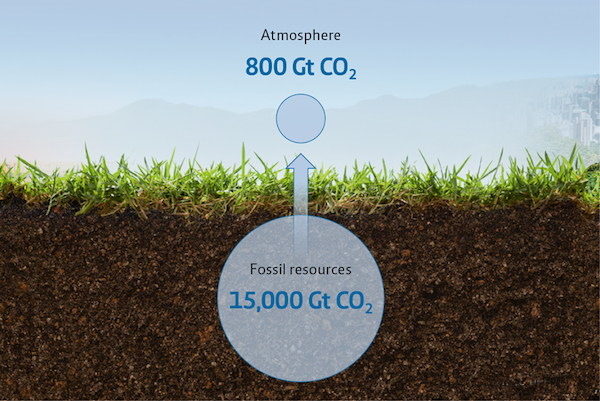
The earth's soil is still home to vast amounts of fossil fuels; yet the atmosphere's capacity to absorb CO_{2} is limited. (Source: MCC)

The complexity of the possible consequences of these (climate) policy actions requires a forward-looking, international perspective. Here, the role of science could be to provide a sound informational basis without prescribing policy decisions.

The target groups of the policy advice of MCC are, among others, decision-makers from international organizations, parliaments and public administration as well as stakeholders from private-sector companies and NGOs.

== Bibliography ==
- Creutzig, F., Ravindranath, N. H., Berndes, G., et al.: Bioenergy and climate change mitigation: an assessment. In: GCB Bioenergy. Vol. 5, Issue 7, 2015, pp. 916–944. (PDF 1,26 MB, English. doi:10.1111/gcbb.12205)
- Creutzig, F., Baiocchi, G.; et al.: A Global Typology of Urban Energy Use and Potentials for an Urbanization Mitigation Wedge. In: Proceedings of the National Academy of Sciences. Vol. 20, Issue 112, 2015, pp. 6283–6288. (PDF 954 kB, English. doi:10.1073/pnas.1315545112)
- Edenhofer, O., Flachsland, C., Jakob, M., Lessmann, K.: The atmosphere as a global commons: challenges for international cooperation and governance. In: The Oxford Handbook of the Macroeconomics of Global Warming. Oxford 2015, Oxford Univ. Press, ISBN 978-0-19-985697-8, pp. 260–296.
- Edenhofer, O., Jakob, M., Creutzig, F., Flachsland, C., et al.: Closing the emission price gap. In: Global Environmental Change. Issue 31, 2015, pp. 132–143. doi:10.1016/j.gloenvcha.2015.01.003 Revised manuscript (PDF 692 kB, English)
- Edenhofer, O., Kowarsch, M.: Cartography of pathways: A new model for environmental policy assessments. In: Environmental Science & Policy. Issue 51, 2015, pp. 56–64. doi:10.1016/j.envsci.2015.03.017 Summary, English.
- Fuss, S., Canadell, J. G., Peters, G. P., Tavoni, M., et al.: Betting on negative emissions. In: Nature Climate Change. Vol. 10, Issue 4, 2014, pp. 850–853. doi:10.1038/nclimate2392
- Jakob, M., Chen, C., Fuss, S., Marxen, A., Rao, N., Edenhofer, O.: Carbon Pricing Revenues Could Close Infrastructure Access Gaps. In: World Development. Issue 84, August 2016, pp. 254–265. doi:10.1016/j.worlddev.2016.03.001
- Jakob, M., Edenhofer, O., 2014. Green growth, degrowth, and the commons. In: Oxford Review of Economic Policy. Issue 30, 2014, pp. 447–468. doi:10.1093/oxrep/gru026 Abstract English
- Klenert, D., Mattauch, L., Edenhofer, O., Lessmann, K.: Infrastructure and Inequality: Insights from Incorporating Key Economic Facts about Household Heterogeneity. Working Paper Version (PDF, 383 kB, English)
- Klenert; D., Mattauch, L.: How to make a carbon tax reform progressive: The role of subsistence consumption. In: Economics Letters. Issue 138, January 2016, pp. 100–103. (PDF; 341 kB, English) doi:10.1016/j.econlet.2015.11.019
- Mercator Research Institute on Global Commons and Climate Change: MCC Evaluation Report. Berlin March 2016. (PDF; 6 MB, English, Archived from the original on May 30, 2016.)
- Steckel, J. C., Edenhofer, O., Jakob, M.: Drivers for the renaissance of coal. In: Proceedings of the National Academy of Sciences. Issue 112 of Volume 29, July 2015, pp. E3775-E3781. (PDF, 1,13MB, English) doi:10.1073/pnas.1422722112
- Von Stechow, C., McCollum, D., Riahi, K., Minx, J. C., et al.: Integrating global climate change mitigation goals with other sustainability objectives: a synthesis. In: Annual Review of Environment and Resources. Vol. 40, 2015, pp. 363–394. doi:10.1146/annurev-environ-021113-095626
