= Ottmar Edenhofer =

German economist

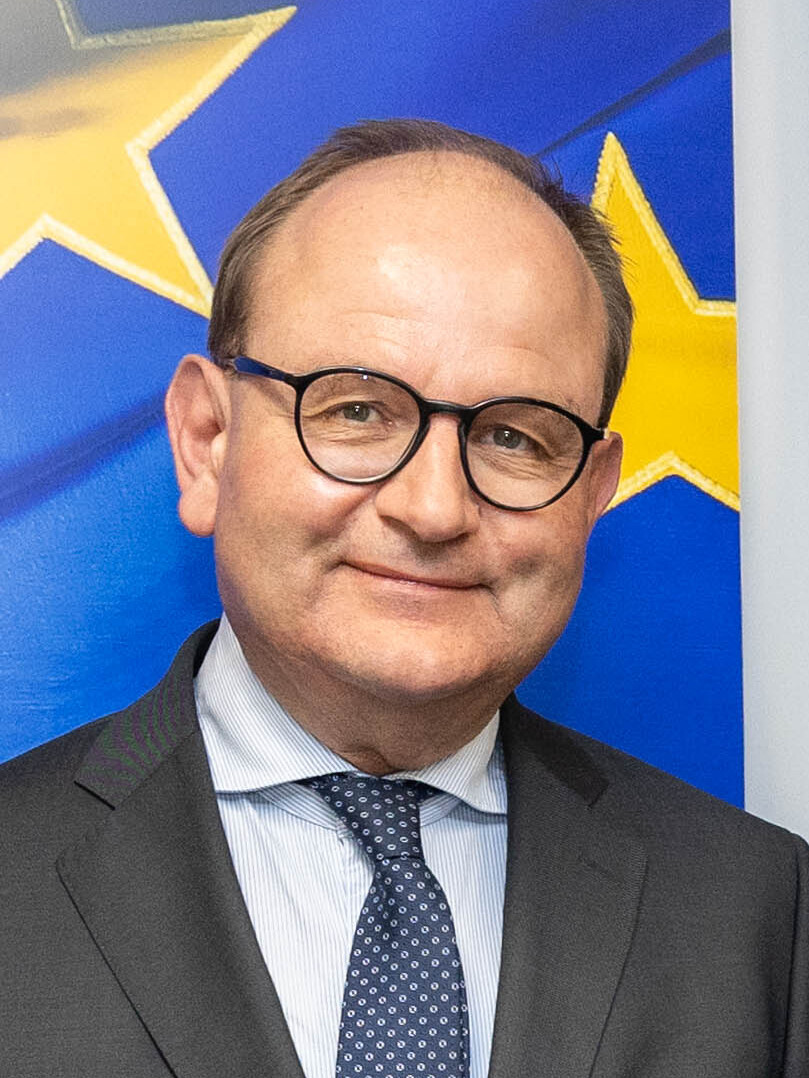
- Edenhofer in 2025
- Born: Ottmar Georg Edenhofer; 8 July 1961 (age 65); Gangkofen, Germany
- Education: Technische Universität Darmstadt (PhD in Economics); Munich School of Philosophy (BA in Philosophy); LMU Munich (Diplom in Economics)
- Known for: Economics of climate change
- Awards: German Environmental Prize (2020)
- Scientific career
- Fields: Economics
- Workplaces: Potsdam Institute for Climate Impact Research; Technische Universität Berlin; Mercator Research Institute on Global Commons and Climate Change

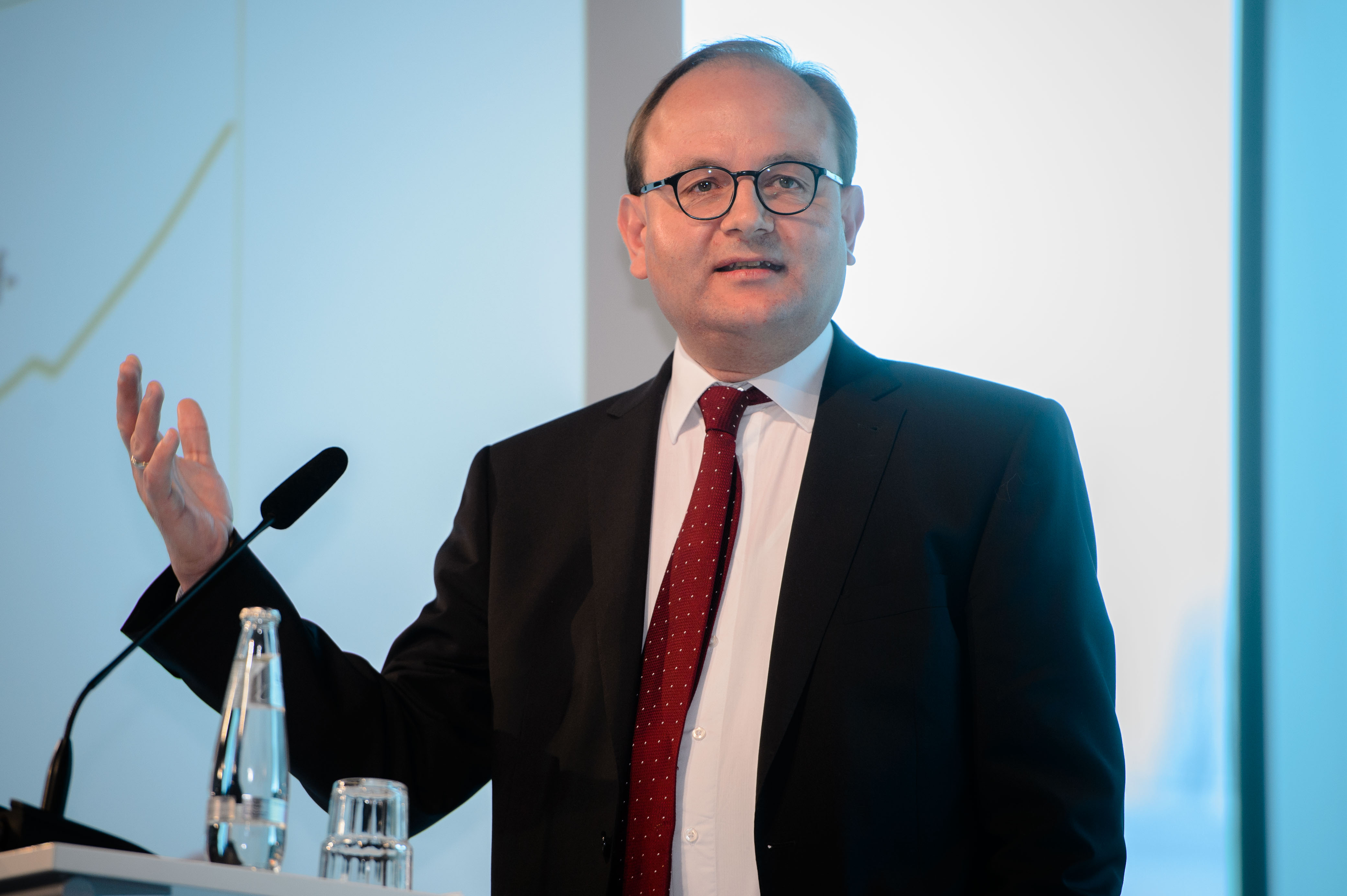
Edenhofer photographed in 2015

Ottmar Georg Edenhofer (born 8 July 1961) is a German economist who is regarded as one of the world's leading experts on climate change policy, environmental and energy policy, and energy economics. His work has been heavily cited. Edenhofer currently holds the professorship of the Economics of Climate Change at Technische Universität Berlin. Together with Earth scientist Johan Rockström, economist Ottmar Edenhofer is scientific director of the Potsdam Institute for Climate Impact Research (PIK), representing the interdisciplinary and solutions-oriented approach of the institute. Furthermore, he was director of the Mercator Research Institute on Global Commons and Climate Change (MCC) which is since 2025 part of the Potsdam Institute for Climate Impact Research as fifth research department "Climate Economics and Policy". From 2008 to 2015 he served as one of the co-chairs of the Intergovernmental Panel on Climate Change (IPCC) Working Group III "Mitigation of Climate Change".

Edenhofer is chair of the European Scientific Advisory Board on Climate Change. This expert advisory board, convened in 2021 by the European Climate Law, advises the European Union independently and on the basis of scientific knowledge. The work of the ESABCC contributed to the European Commission's recommendation of a climate target for 2040 (90% reduction in net greenhouse gas emissions). He is a member of the German National Academy of Sciences Leopoldina and of the German Academy of Science and Engineering (acatech). In 2020 Professor Edenhofer was honoured with the most prestigious environmental prize in Germany the Environment Prize (German Environment Foundation) for his groundbreaking work in the field of carbon pricing. Before, he was awarded the Romano-Guardini-Prize by the Katholische Akademie in Bayern.

== Education ==
Edenhofer was born in Gangkofen, Lower Bavaria, Germany. He completed his diploma in economics with honors at LMU Munich. He belonged the Jesuit Order from 1987 to 1994 and following his novitiate earned a bachelor's degree in philosophy at the Munich School of Philosophy. During this time he also founded an enterprise in the public health sector and led a humanitarian aid organization in Croatia and Bosnia from 1991 to 1993. After leaving the Order, Edenhofer worked as a research assistant from 1994 to 2000 and completed his PhD in economics summa cum laude at Technische Universität Darmstadt in 1999 under the supervision of Prof. Dr. Carlo C. Jäger.

== Career ==
In 2018, Edenhofer was appointed director of the Potsdam Institute for Climate Impact Research with Earth scientist Johan Rockström. Previously, Edenhofer was deputy director and chief economist at the Potsdam Institute for Climate Impact Research (PIK), where he headed Research Area III ("Sustainable Solutions Strategies").

Since June 2020, Edenhofer is project lead of the major Copernicus research activity Ariadne on the German energy transition. The project is investigating options how climate targets can be met with socially accepted policy instruments

From 2008 to 2015, he served as a co-chair of Working Group III "Mitigation of Climate Change" of the (IPCC). Under his leadership as co-chair, the IPCC published the Special Report on Renewable Energy Sources and Climate Change Mitigation (SRREN), and the Fifth Assessment Report on Climate Change in 2014. In 2012, he became director of the newly founded Mercator Research Institute on Global Commons and Climate Change (MCC).

From 2004 to 2008, Edenhofer was a lead author of the Fourth Assessment Report on Climate Change published by the Intergovernmental Panel on Climate Change (IPCC) in 2007. The IPCC was awarded the Nobel Peace Prize in the same year.

Since 2008, Edenhofer holds the professorship for the Economics of Climate Change at Technische Universität Berlin.

== Other activities and advisory roles ==
Edenhofer has advised German Chancellor Angela Merkel, and Federal President Frank-Walter Steinmeier on carbon pricing. Edenhofer was asked to submit an expertise on carbon pricing options to the German Council of Economic Experts. In 2021, Edenhofer was appointed to the Vatican's Dicastry for Promoting Integral Human Development by Pope Francis.

Edenhofer is a member of the OECD Advisory Council “Growth, Investment and the Low-Carbon Transition”. At the invitation of Ségolène Royal and Feike Sijbesma, co-chairs of the Carbon Pricing Leadership Coalition (CPLC) High Level Assembly, he became a member of the High-Level Commission on Carbon Prices – co-chaired by Joseph Stiglitz and Nicholas Stern – in 2019/20. In June 2021, he was appointed to the World Bank–International Monetary Fund High-Level Advisory Group (HLAG) on Sustainable and Inclusive Recovery and Growth, co-chaired by Mari Pangestu, Ceyla Pazarbasioglu, and Nicholas Stern.

In addition, Edenhofer holds the following unpaid or paid honorary positions:

- Since 2007: Fellow of the Academy of Sciences in Hamburg, Germany
- Since 2008: Member of the German Association Socialpolitik, Research Committee Environmental and Resource Economics
- 2012-2016: Member of the Foundation Council of Munich Re
- 2012-2019: Member of the Advisory Committee, Green Growth Knowledge Platform (GGKP) (a joint effort of the Global Green Growth Institute, the Organisation for Economic Co-operation and Development (OECD), the United Nations Environment Programme (UNEP), and the World Bank)
- 2012: Member of the Advisory Committee of the Green Growth Knowledge Platform (GGKP)
- 2013: Chair of the Euro-CASE Energy Platform
- Since 2015: Member of the German Academy of Science and Engineering (acatech)
- Since 2015: Member of the advisory council of the Carbon Mitigation Initiative (CMI) der Princeton University
- Since 2016: Member of the Sustainability Council of Volkswagen
- Since 2016: Editor of Review of Environmental Economics and Policy (REEP)
- Since 2018: Member of the High-Level Commission on Carbon Prices
- Since 2018: Member of the German National Academy of Science Leopoldina
- Since 2018: Member of the Scientific Advisory Board to the European Institute on Economics and the Environment (EIEE)
- Since 2019: co-chair of the Wissenschaftsplattform Klimaschutz
- Since 2019: Member of the scientific advisory council of the ZEW - Leibniz Centre for European Economic Research
- Since 2019: Member of the advisory board of the Laudato Sí Research Institute (LSRI)
- Since 2019: Member of the Food System Economics Commission (EAT)
- Since 2021: Elected member of the Central Committee of German Catholics
- Since 2021: Deputy chair of the Sustainability Advisory Board of the state of Brandenburg
- Since 2021: Member of the High-Level Advisory Group on Sustainable and Inclusive Recovery and Growth (HLAG)

Besides his teaching and research activities, Edenhofer actively contributes to public debates about political climate protection measures in Germany and the European Union.

== Research interests ==
Edenhofer's research explores the impact of induced technological change on mitigation costs and mitigation strategies, the value capture and distribution of land rents, and the design of instruments for climate and energy policy. He specializes in the economics of atmospheric stabilization, social cost-benefit analysis, land value tax, sustainability theory, economic growth theory, environmental economics, welfare theory, and general intertemporal equilibrium theory.

== Philosophy and position on climate change ==
Edenhofer says that his interest in philosophy and economics was influenced by his readings of the works of Henry George, Karl Marx, Max Weber, Ludwig Wittgenstein, and John Dewey. Regarding climate change he says: "Denying out and out that climate change is a problem for humanity, as some cynics do, is an unethical, unacceptable position."

Edenhofer is a proponent of carbon pricing. He points out that both cap-and-trade and a direct carbon tax can be implemented to reduce greenhouse emissions and encourage innovation to preserve the climate. He feels strongly that moving the global economy to a low-carbon threshold requires huge increases in the use of renewable energy across all economic sectors.

In a widely quoted 2010 NZZ am Sonntag interview, Edenhofer said: "One must say clearly that we redistribute de facto the world's wealth by climate policy." The quote is frequently presented without context, suggesting climate policy to be a pretext to leftist redistribution policy. In fact, the interview, ahead of the COP16 climate negotiations in Cancún, had focused on proposals for global carbon budgets, emissions trading and the allocation of emissions rights among countries. The famous line was a response to a question about whether carbon constraints would effectively reduce the value of fossil-fuel resources owned by some countries. Edenhofer replied that developed countries had effectively "expropriated" atmospheric space through past emissions. If future emissions rights were allocated on a per-capita basis, poorer countries—particularly in Africa—would receive valuable emissions allowances or financial transfers.

== Publications ==
- Ottmar Edenhofer publications indexed by Google Scholar

== See also ==
- German Academy of Science and Engineering (acatech)
- Potsdam Institute for Climate Impact Research (PIK)
