= Integrated assessment modelling =

Scientific modeling that combines society, economy and the climate system

Integrated assessment modelling (IAM) or integrated modelling (IM) (Note: This second shortened version is used in the 2014 IPCC Fifth Assessment Report. Note too the American spellings of integrated assessment modeling and integrated modeling.) is a type of scientific modelling that tries to link main features of society and economy with the biosphere and atmosphere into one modelling framework. The goal of integrated assessment modelling is to accommodate informed policy-making, usually in the context of climate change though also in other areas of human and social development. While the detail and extent of integrated disciplines varies strongly per model, all climatic integrated assessment modelling includes economic processes as well as processes producing greenhouse gases. Other integrated assessment models also integrate other aspects of human development such as education, health, infrastructure, and governance.

These models are integrated because they span multiple academic disciplines, including economics and climate science and for more comprehensive models also energy systems, land-use change, agriculture, infrastructure, conflict, governance, technology, education, and health. The word assessment comes from the use of these models to provide information for answering policy questions. To quantify these integrated assessment studies, numerical models are used. Integrated assessment modelling does not provide predictions for the future but rather estimates what possible scenarios look like.

There are different types of integrated assessment models. One classification distinguishes between firstly models that quantify future developmental pathways or scenarios and provide detailed, sectoral information on the complex processes modelled. Here they are called process-based models. Secondly, there are models that aggregate the costs of climate change and climate change mitigation to find estimates of the total costs of climate change. A second classification makes a distinction between models that extrapolate verified patterns (via econometrics equations), or models that determine (globally) optimal economic solutions from the perspective of a social planner, assuming (partial) equilibrium of the economy.

== Process-based models ==
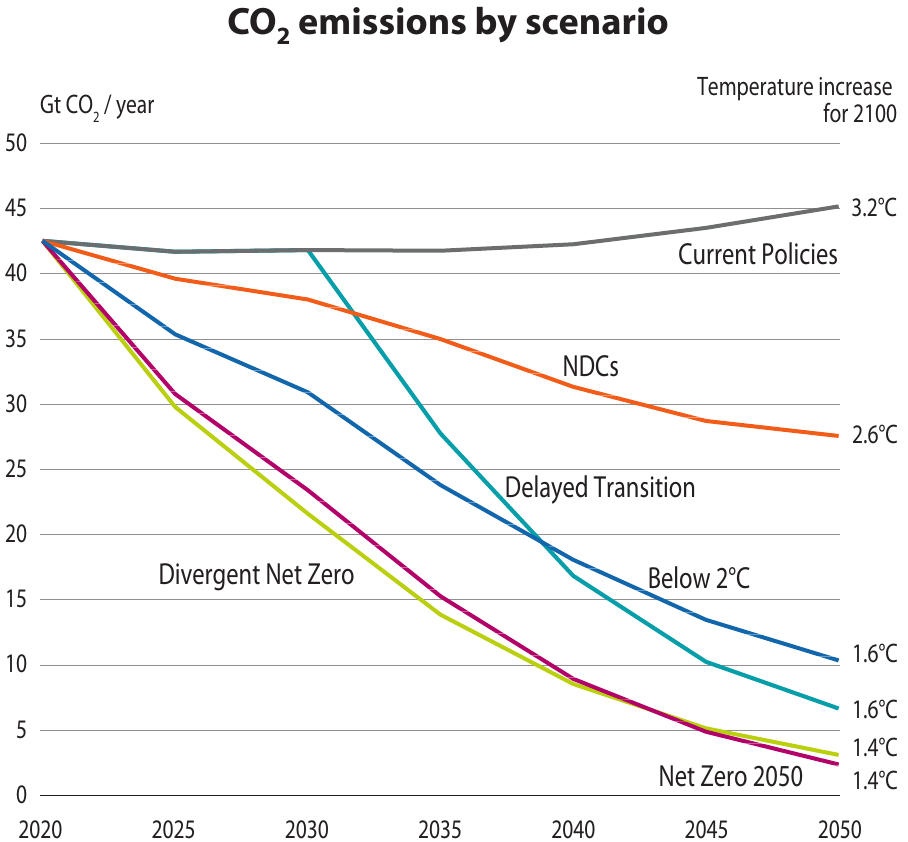
Annual greenhouse gas emissions in the various NGFS climate scenarios 2022, based on the REMIND-MAgPIE model by the Potsdam Institute for Climate Impact Research

Intergovernmental Panel on Climate Change (IPCC) has relied on process-based integrated assessment models (PB-IAM) to quantify mitigation scenarios. They have been used to explore different pathways for staying within climate policy targets such as the 1.5 °C target agreed upon in the Paris Agreement. Moreover, these models have underpinned research including energy policy assessment and simulate the Shared socioeconomic pathways. Notable modelling frameworks include IMAGE, MESSAGEix, AIM/GCE, GCAM, REMIND-MAgPIE, and WITCH-GLOBIOM. While these scenarios are highly policy-relevant, interpretation of the scenarios should be done with care.

Non-equilibrium models include those based on econometric equations and evolutionary economics (such as E3ME), and agent-based models (such as the agent-based DSK-model). These models typically do not assume rational and representative agents, nor market equilibrium in the long term.

== Aggregate cost-benefit models ==
Cost-benefit integrated assessment models are the main tools for calculating the social cost of carbon, or the marginal social cost of emitting one more tonne of carbon (as carbon dioxide) into the atmosphere at any point in time. For instance, the DICE, PAGE, and FUND models have been used by the US Interagency Working Group to calculate the social cost of carbon and its results have been used for regulatory impact analysis.

This type of modelling is carried out to find the total cost of climate impacts, which are generally considered a negative externality not captured by conventional markets. In order to correct such a market failure, for instance by using a carbon tax, the cost of emissions is required. However, the estimates of the social cost of carbon are highly uncertain and will remain so for the foreseeable future. It has been argued that "IAM-based analyses of climate policy create a perception of knowledge and precision that is illusory, and can fool policy-makers into thinking that the forecasts the models generate have some kind of scientific legitimacy". Still, it has been argued that attempting to calculate the social cost of carbon is useful to gain insight into the effect of certain processes on climate impacts, as well as to better understand one of the determinants international cooperation in the governance of climate agreements.

Integrated assessment models have not been used solely to assess environmental or climate change-related fields. They have also been used to analyze patterns of conflict, the Sustainable Development Goals, trends across issue area in Africa, and food security.

== Shortcomings ==
All numerical models have shortcomings. Integrated Assessment Models for climate change, in particular, have been severely criticized for problematic assumptions that led to greatly overestimating the cost/benefit ratio for mitigating climate change while relying on economic models inappropriate to the problem. In 2021, the integrated assessment modeling community examined gaps in what was termed the "possibility space" and how these might best be consolidated and addressed. In an October 2021 working paper, Nicholas Stern argues that existing IAMs are inherently unable to capture the economic realities of the climate crisis under its current state of rapid progress.

Models undertaking optimisation methodologies have received numerous different critiques, a prominent one however, draws on the ideas of dynamical systems theory which understands systems as changing with no deterministic pathway or end-state. This implies a very large, or even infinite, number of possible states of the system in the future with aspects and dynamics that cannot be known to observers of the current state of the system. This type of uncertainty around future states of an evolutionary system has been referred to as 'radical' or 'fundamental' uncertainty. This has led some researchers to call for more work on the broader array of possible futures and calling for modelling research on those alternative scenarios that have yet to receive substantial attention, for example post-growth scenarios.

IAMs have also been criticised for undervaluing or underestimating the role of primary renewable electricity, generated primarily through wind and solar power, and closely related integration concepts like sector coupling, electrification of end-use and power-to-X, while overvaluing the role of bioenergy and CCS. Researchers also note a major discrepancy between the IAM modelling community and the energy system modelling community, thus arguing for a stronger incorporation of the findings of the energy system modelling community in IAMs.

Because integrated assessment models play an important role in climate mitigation assessments—particularly in the work of the IPCC’s Working Group III—they have also been examined by scholars in fields such as Science and Technology Studies and Political Ecology. This research argues that modeling practices and assumptions have ethical implications and can influence climate policy debates, for example by shaping expectations about mitigation pathways such as those involving negative emissions. Furthermore, IAMs are criticized to insufficiently deal with issues of justice. Some authors therefore emphasize the social and institutional context in which models are developed and used, and have suggested combining modeling with other approaches, including participatory or interdisciplinary methods, to explore a wider range of possible futures.
