= Joeri Rogelj =

Belgian climatologist

- Born: 1980 (age 45–46)
- Education: ETH Zurich (Ph.D., 2010–2013); KU Leuven (1998–2005)
- Awards: Piers Sellers Prize (2016); International Science Council Early Career Scientist Award, Europe (2021)
- Scientific career
- Fields: Climate change
- Workplaces: Potsdam Institute for Climate Impact Research; ETH Zurich International Institute for Applied Systems Analysis; Imperial College London

Joeri Rogelj (born 1980) is a Belgian climate scientist working on solutions to climate change. He explores how societies can transform towards sustainable futures. He is a professor in Climate Science and Policy at the Centre for Environmental Policy (CEP) and Director of Research at the Grantham Institute – Climate Change and Environment, both at Imperial College London. He is also affiliated with the International Institute for Applied Systems Analysis. He is an author of several climate reports by the Intergovernmental Panel on Climate Change (IPCC) and the United Nations Environment Programme (UNEP), and a member of the European Scientific Advisory Board for Climate Change.

== Education ==
Rogelj completed an engineering degree at the KU Leuven (Belgium) in 2003, and also obtained a postgraduate degree in Cultures and Development Studies at the same institution in 2005. He completed his PhD in climate physics at Swiss Federal Institute for Technology (ETH Zurich) in 2013 under the supervision of Prof. Reto Knutti on the topic of uncertainties in low greenhouse gas emissions scenarios.

== Career ==
Rogelj started his climate science career in the PRIMAP Research Group at the Potsdam Institute for Climate Impact Research (PIK) in 2009. After obtaining his PhD, he joined the International Institute for Applied Systems Analysis. In 2018, he joined the Grantham Institute – Climate Change and Environment at Imperial College London.

From 2006 to 2008, Rogelj worked as a project engineer on rural development projects in Rwanda.

== Research and impact ==
Rogelj works on the intersection between climate science, law and policy, and publishes on international climate agreements such as the Copenhagen Accord or the Paris Agreement, carbon budgets, emission pathways that limit global warming to 1.5 °C and 2 °C, net zero emissions targets, and linkages between climate, sustainable development, and justice.

According to the International Science Council, he has pioneered "work on climate change scenarios [that] changed the global conversation around the feasibility of keeping global warming to 1.5°C in advance of the UN Paris Agreement" in 2015.

He serves as a lead author on the annual Emissions Gap Reports from the United Nations Environment Programme (UNEP) that provide annual updates on the gap between country pledges and emission reductions necessary to meet the goals of the Paris Agreement.

He was a contributing author to the 2013-2014 Fifth Assessment Report of the Intergovernmental Panel on Climate Change (IPCC), a coordinating author of the 2018 IPCC Special Report on Global Warming of 1.5°C, and a lead author on the 2021 IPCC Sixth Assessment Report.

In 2019, he served as a member of the Climate Science Advisory Group to the United Nations Secretary-General's Climate Action Summit.

Since 2022, he serves on the "European Scientific Advisory Board on Climate Change" that provides independent scientific advice on EU measures, climate targets and indicative greenhouse gas budgets.

Rogelj also provides scientific evidence for climate change litigation, for example, in support of "Children vs Climate Crisis" in which 16 children from across the world petition the UN Committee on the Rights of the Child to hold five of the world's leading economic powers accountable for inaction on the climate crisis.

== Awards and honours ==
Rogelj was awarded an Honorary Doctorate by the Free University of Brussels (VUB) for "Science in Service of Humanity". Rogelj received the 2021 Early Career Scientist Award for Europe from the International Science Council (ISC) for the "exceptional impact" his research has had on international climate policy. In 2016, he received the inaugural Piers Sellers Award for "world leading solution-focused climate research" by the Priestley International Centre for Climate. In 2014, he received the ETH Medal for his outstanding PhD thesis and in 2010 the Peccei Award for outstanding work by a young scientist.

Rogelj is a Clarivate Web of Science Highly Cited Researcher recognizing the world's most influential researchers of the past decade, and was ranked 31st in The Reuters Hot List of the World's Top Climate Scientists.

== Selected works ==
- Rogelj, J., Geden, O., Cowie, A., Reisinger, A., 2021. Three ways to improve net-zero emissions targets. Nature 591, 365–368. https://doi.org/10.1038/d41586-021-00662-3
- Rogelj, J., et al, 2018. Scenarios towards limiting global mean temperature increase below 1.5 °C. Nature Clim. Change 8, 325–332. https://doi.org/10.1038/s41558-018-0091-3
- Rogelj, J., et al, 2016. Paris Agreement climate proposals need a boost to keep warming well below 2 °C. Nature 534, 631–639. https://doi.org/10.1038/nature18307
- Rogelj, J., et al, 2015. Zero emission targets as long-term global goals for climate protection. Environmental Research Letters 10, 105007. https://doi.org/10.1088/1748-9326/10/10/105007
- Rogelj, J., et al, 2015. Energy system transformations for limiting end-of-century warming to below 1.5 °C. Nature Clim. Change 5, 519–527. https://doi.org/10.1038/nclimate2572
- Rogelj, J., Meinshausen, M., Knutti, R., 2012. Global warming under old and new scenarios using IPCC climate sensitivity range estimates. Nature Clim. Change 2, 248–253. https://doi.org/10.1038/nclimate1385
- Rogelj, J., et al, 2010. Copenhagen Accord pledges are paltry. Nature 464, 1126–1128. https://doi.org/10.1038/4641126a
- Rogelj, J., Shindell, D., Jiang, K., Fifita, S., Forster, P., Ginzburg, V., Handa, C., Kheshgi, H., Kobayashi, S., Kriegler, E., Mundaca, L., Séférian, R., Vilariño, M.V., 2018. Mitigation pathways compatible with 1.5 °C in the context of sustainable development, in: Flato, G., Fuglestvedt, J., Mrabet, R., Schaeffer, R. (Eds.), Global Warming of 1.5 °C: An IPCC Special Report on the Impacts of Global Warming of 1.5 °C above Pre-Industrial Levels and Related Global Greenhouse Gas Emission Pathways, in the Context of Strengthening the Global Response to the Threat of Climate Change, Sustainable Development, and Efforts to Eradicate Poverty. IPCC/WMO, Geneva, Switzerland, pp. 93–174. https://www.ipcc.ch/sr15/
