= Network for Greening the Financial System =

Finance sector organisation

- Abbreviation: NGFS
- Formation: December 2017
- Chair: Ravi Menon
- Head of Secretariat: Jean Boissinot
- Website: https://www.ngfs.net/

The Network for Greening the Financial System (NGFS) is a network of 114 central banks and financial supervisors that aims to accelerate the scaling up of green finance and develop recommendations for central banks' role for climate change. The NGFS was created in 2017 and its secretariat is hosted by the Banque de France. Its current chair is Ravi Menon, Managing Director of the Monetary Authority of Singapore. The NGFS has been awarded best green initiative of the year 2020 by Centralbanking.com.

According to its charter, the purpose of the NGFS is "to define, promote and contribute to the development of best practices to be implemented within and outside of the Membership of the NGFS and to conduct or commission analytical work on green finance."

The NGFS was announced at the Paris "One Planet Summit" in December 2017. The network was launched by 8 founding central banks, under the leadership of Banque de France's governor François Villeroy de Galhau, the Dutch Central Bank's Frank Elderson and the Bank of England's former governor Mark Carney.

== Work and activities ==
The NGFS organises events and research on climate change.

=== Recommendations for central banks and supervisory authorities ===
In 2021, the NGFS identified 9 policy options that could be chosen by central banks to align their monetary policy with climate objectives.

The NGFS work is currently organised around 4 workstreams (WS) and 2 task forces (TF):

- WS "Supervision", chaired by Mr Tolga Yalkin from the Office of the Superintendent of Financial Institutions
- WS "Scenario Design and Analysis", chaired by Mr Livio Stracca from the European Central Bank
- WS "Monetary Policy", chaired by Mr James Talbot from the Bank of England
- WS "Net Zero for Central Banks", co-chaired by Mr Paolo Angelini from the Bank of Italy and Ms Simone Robbers from the Reserve Bank of New Zealand
- TF "Nature-Related Risks", co-chaired by Ms Emmanuelle Assouan from the Bank of France and Ms Saskia de Vries from De Nederlandsche Bank
- TF "Capacity Building and Training", co-chaired by Ms Madelena Mohamed from the Central Bank of Malaysia and Mr Jeffery Yong from the Bank for International Settlements

=== Climate scenarios ===
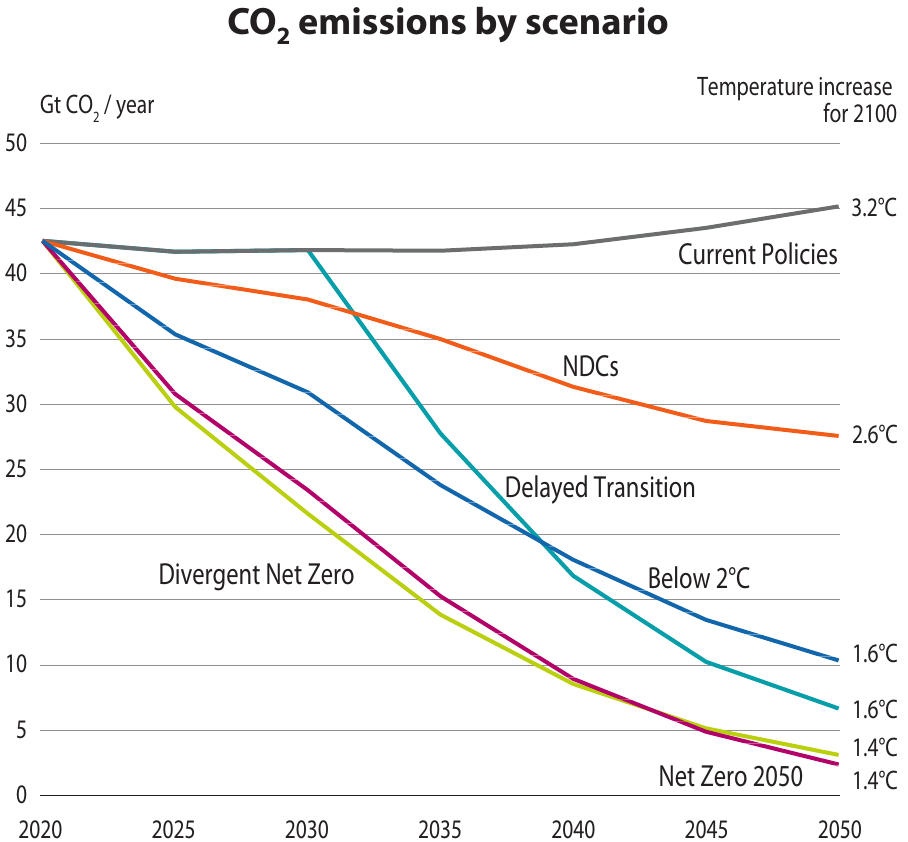
Annual greenhouse gas emissions in the various climate scenarios of the NGFS, 2022

In June 2020, the NGFS presented its climate scenarios as a common baseline for analysing climate risks to the economy and the financial system. Expanded and updated data were published in the two subsequent years. The scenarios are based on the three integrated assessment models REMIND-MAgPIE (Potsdam Institute for Climate Impact Research), GCAM (University of Maryland) and MESSAGEix-GLOBIOM (International Institute for Applied Systems Analysis). Their results were fed into the NiGEM model (National Institute of Economic and Social Research) to conduct further macroeconomic analyses on inflation or unemployment. In addition, climate data provided by Climate Analytics and the ETH Zurich are published.

The following six scenarios were examined: "Current Policies" considers only already implemented climate policies, while "NDCs" assumes that the voluntary pledges of Nationally Determined Contributions are met. "Below 2°C" assumes that a two-degree target in line with the Paris Agreement will be met, while "Net Zero 2050" assumes a 1.5-degree target will be achieved through early, globally coordinated climate policies. "Delayed Transition" assumes tighter climate policies only from 2030, while "Divergent Net Zero" envisages regionally and sectorally different climate adaptation.

== Governance and membership ==
In 2020, the NGFS comprised 75 members and 13 observers.

Members of the NGFS
Name	Membership	Join date	Withdrawal date
Banque de France and ACPR	Permanent member	2017	
Bank of England	Permanent member	2017	
De Nederlandsche Bank	Permanent member	2017	
Austrian Financial Market Authority			
Banco Central de Costa Rica		2019	
Banca d'Italia			
Banco de México	Permanent member		
Banco de España		2018	
Banco de la República (Central Bank of Colombia)		2019	
Banco de Portugal		2018	
Bank Al-Maghrib		2018	
Bank Indonesia		2019	
Bank Negara Malaysia (Central Bank of Malaysia)		2018	
Bank of Canada			
Bank of Finland		2018	
Bank of Greece			
Bank of Israel			
Bank of Japan		2019	
Bank of Korea		2019	
Bank of Mauritius		2020	
Bank of Slovenia			
Bank of Thailand		2019	
Banque Centrale de Tunisie		2019	
Banque centrale du Luxembourg		2018	
Bank of Estonia		2020	
Bank of Latvia		2020	
Bank of Lithuania		2020	
Bank of Russia		2019	
Bangko Sentral ng Pilipinas		2020	
Central Bank of Brazil		2020	
Bundesanstalt für Finanzdienstleistungsaufsicht (BaFin)	Permanent member	2017	
Bank of Mauritius			
Central Bank of Armenia		2020	
Central Bank of Cyprus		2020	
Central Bank of Hungary			
Central Bank of Malta			
Central Bank of Seychelles			
Central Bank of West African States		2020	
Comision Nacional Bancaria y de Valores		2019	
Comisión para el Mercado Financiero de Chile		2019	
Commission de contrôle des activités financières (Monaco)			
Commission de Surveillance du Secteur Financier (Luxembourg)			
Danish Financial Supervisory Authority		2020	
Danmarks Nationalbank			
Department of Financial Services (DFS) of the State of New York		2019	
Deutsche Bundesbank	Permanent member	2017	
Dubai Financial Services Authority			
European Banking Authority (EBA)		2018	
European Central Bank (ECB)	Permanent member	2018	
European Insurance and Occupational Pensions Authority (EIOPA)			
Federal Reserve Bank of the United States	Permanent member, withdrew 17 January 2025	2020	2025
Finansinspektionen (Swedish FSA)	Permanent member	2017	
Finanstilsynet (Norwegian FSA)			
Guernsey Financial Services Commission		2019	
Isle of Man Financial Services Authority		2020	
Istituto per la Vigilanza sulle Assicurazioni (IVASS)			
Hong Kong Monetary Authority	Founding member	2017	
Japan FSA		2018	
Malta Financial Services Authority		2020	
Monetary Authority of Singapore	Permanent member	2017	
Národná banka Slovenska		2019	
National Bank of Belgium		2018	
National Bank of Cambodia		2020	
National Bank of Georgia		2020	
National Bank of Romania			
Norges Bank		2018	
Oesterreichische Nationalbank (OeNB)		2018	
People's Bank of China	Permanent member	2017	
Reserve Bank of Australia		2018	
Reserve Bank of New Zealand		2018	
South African Reserve Bank			
Superintendencia Financiera De Colombia			
Sveriges Riksbank		2018	
Swiss Financial Market Supervisory Authority (FINMA)			
Swiss National Bank			
Asian Development Bank	Observer		
Bank for International Settlement	Observer	2018	
Basel Committee on Banking Supervision	Observer		
European Bank for Reconstruction and Development	Observer	2018	
International Organization of Securities COmmission (IOSCO)	Observer	2019	
European Investment Bank	Observer		
IDB (Inter-American Development Bank)	Observer	2019	
International Association of Insurance Supervisors	Observer		
International Monetary Fund	Observer	2019	
NIB (Nordic Investment bank)	Observer		
Organisation for Economic Cooperation and Development (OECD)	Observer	2018	
Sustainable Insurance Forum	Observer	2018	
World Bank and the International Finance Corporation	Observer	2018	
Reserve Bank of India	Member	2021	
National Bank of Serbia	Member	2021	
