= Potsdam Institute for Climate Impact Research =

German research institute

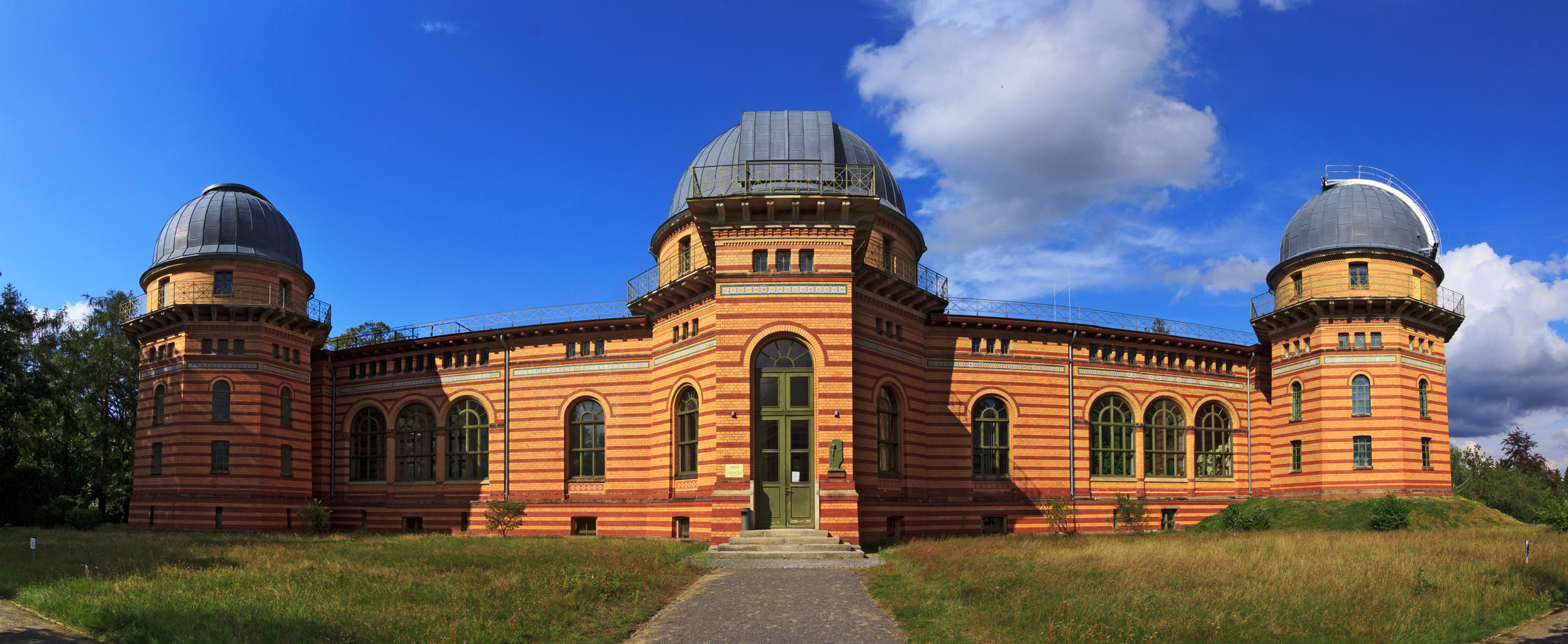
- The Potsdam Institute for Climate Impact Research is part of the Albert Einstein Science Park and hosted in the old Astrophysical Observatory Potsdam building.
- Established: 1992
- Mission: Advancing science and developing solutions for a safe and just climate future through interdisciplinary research for global sustainability.
- Staff: Approx. 407 employees, including 261 scientists. (2022)
- Budget: 23.4 million euros (2022)
- Location: Potsdam, Germany
- Website: https://www.pik-potsdam.de/

The Potsdam Institute for Climate Impact Research (PIK, German: Potsdam-Institut für Klimafolgenforschung) is a German government-funded research institute addressing crucial scientific questions in the fields of global change, climate impacts, and sustainable development. Ranked among the top environmental think tanks worldwide, it is one of the leading research institutions and part of a global network of scientific and academic institutions working on questions of global environmental change. It is a member of the Leibniz Association, whose institutions perform research on subjects of high relevance to society.

Heads of the institute are Ottmar Edenhofer, Johan Rockström and Bettina Hörstrup.

== History ==
PIK was founded in 1992 by Hans Joachim Schellnhuber, who became the institute's first director. In 2018 he was succeeded by two joint directors—the climate economist Ottmar Edenhofer, and Earth scientist Johan Rockström, formerly director of the Stockholm Resilience Centre. About 400 people work at the institute that is located on Potsdam's historic Telegrafenberg. Researchers from the natural and social sciences analyze the Earth system, assess climate risks and develop policies and solution pathways towards a manageable climate future.

== Organization ==
The Potsdam Institute is part of the Leibniz Association. Its board consists of three directors, Ottmar Edenhofer, Johan Rockström and Bettina Hörstrup, who is the administrative director. PIK has four research departments (RDs) and seven Future Labs.

=== Research departments ===
==== Earth System Analysis (RD 1) ====
Research Department 1 (RD1) provides the Earth system science foundation of PIK. It focuses on the understanding and modelling of the physical and biogeochemical processes that govern the Earth system (i.e. Oceans, Atmosphere and Biosphere) and its response to human interference. RD1 research is guided by four major themes that PIK helped to establish:

- Tipping points in the climate system: Non-linear Earth system processes and threshold behavior.
- Planetary boundaries: Definition, quantification and operationalization of planetary boundaries and their interactions.
- Earth trajectories: Dynamics and modes of operation of the Earth system (for example circulation changes, feedback systems) under natural and human forcing, and the resulting long- and short-term trajectories.
- Extreme events: Development of an understanding of the dynamical mechanisms and changing statistics of extreme weather events on a warming Earth.

==== Climate Resilience (RD 2) ====
RD2 strives to improve the understanding of climate resilience, i.e. resilience of social and ecological systems to climate change, in various sectors and across multiple spatial scales. As a general framing for RD2 research, resilience entails aspects of persistence—the capacity of systems to resist and absorb short-term shocks, yet remain within critical thresholds; adaptability—the capacity to recover, adjust to changing external drivers, and thereby remain on the current trajectory; and transformability—the capacity to cross thresholds, if necessary, into new, robust long-term development trajectories.

- Climate change impacts and their socio-economic consequences related to land use, agriculture, forests, hydrological systems, human health and well-being, and urban areas;
- Adaptive capacity of societies and ecosystems across scales at different levels of global warming;
- Synergies between climate change adaptation and mitigation to improve climate resilience and achieve sustainable human development.

==== Transformation Pathways (RD 3) ====
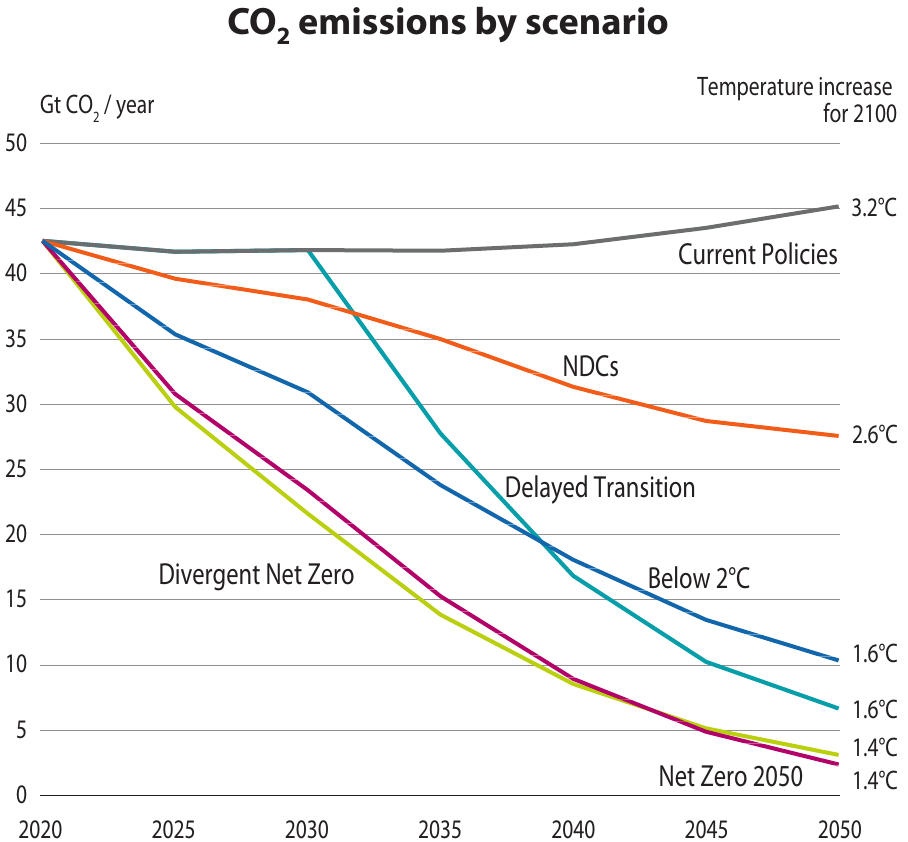
Annual greenhouse gas emissions in the various NGFS climate scenarios 2022, based on PIK's integrated assessment model REMIND-MAgPIE

Research Department 3 (RD3) aims to provide an integrated perspective on climate change mitigation and climate change impact pathways to inform societies' choices. Climate protection may have costs, but unabated climate change can have strong adverse effects on economic development; loss of biodiversity is amplified by climate change, but could also be increased by certain mitigation strategies relying on the use of land; climate protection might create winners and losers, but climate change itself will have strong distributional impacts and affect low income groups disproportionately.

- Development of integrated climate protection and climate impact pathways. Evaluation of mitigation strategies and remaining impacts with regard to socio-economic development, distributional effects and planetary integrity.
- Societal impacts of climate change. Assessment of climate change as a potential driver of migration, displacement, and conflict.
- Sustainable land use. Evaluation of land-use transformation pathways exploiting mitigation potential while at the same time ensuring biosphere integrity.
- Sustainable energy use. Exploration of transformation pathways towards sustainable and carbon-neutral energy use taking into account their resource use and environmental footprint.
- Policy strategies for climate protection pathways. Analysis of regulatory and economic climate policy instruments with regard to their efficiency and distributional implications.

==== Complexity Science (RD 4) ====
This RD is devoted to Machine Learning, Nonlinear Methods and decision strategies. Of particular focus are:

- Climate phenomena and extremes: Prediction and modelling with complex networks, nonlinear data analysis, statistical physics, and machine learning.
- Abrupt climate transitions: Detection and prediction with advanced time series analysis, numerical modelling, and analytical concepts.
- Socio-economic and infrastructure networks: Understanding dynamics through new modelling and stability concepts.
- Climate decisions: Uncovering principles and modelling interactions using econometrics, game theory, and machine learning.

=== Future Labs ===
Six of the FutureLabs are time-limited and will be evaluated after five years. One permanent FutureLab has been established that aims to strengthen the institute's efforts in capacity building activities as well as its social metabolism research endeavors.

==== FutureLab on Social Metabolism & Impacts (Permanent Future Lab) ====
Human societies depend on a continuous throughput of materials and energy for their reproduction. Raw materials must be extracted from the environment, transformed into goods and services (e.g. food, housing and mobility) and eventually all materials are released back to the environment as emissions and waste. Free energy and socially organized human labor are required to keep this social metabolism going.

==== FutureLab on Public Economics and Climate Finance ====
The research within this Future Lab is undertaken against the background of the question how we can reconcile short-term human well-being with long-term environmental sustainability. It aims to provide scientific advances and policy-relevant insights regarding the economics of the global commons—which include natural commons, such as the atmosphere, land, and forests, as well as social commons, such as health care and education systems, basic infrastructures and a stable financial system.

==== FutureLab on Security, Ethnic Conflicts and Migration ====
With this FutureLab, PIK kick-started dedicated research on the implications of climate change for human security and conflict, accounting for the potential roles of human migration and displacement as drivers, outcomes, or mediating factors.

==== FutureLab on Game Theory and Networks of Interacting Agents ====
In this cross-institutional FutureLab between PIK and the Mercator Research Institute on Global Commons and Climate Change (MCC), established in January 2019 and hosted by PIK's Research Department 4, a small team of interdisciplinary researchers explores and develops cutting-edge modeling and analysis methods for complex decision situations with several decision makers, and applies these to problems in national and international climate policy and sustainable management.

==== FutureLab on Earth Resilience in the Anthropocene ====
With the exponential rise in human pressures such as greenhouse gas emissions and land-use change, there is an increasing risk of crossing critical thresholds. At which point, there would be a degradation of the foundational biophysical processes that regulate the state of the Earth. There is an urgent need for understanding and quantifying the state of the self-regulatory and regenerative capacities of our planetary life-support system.

==== FutureLab on Inequality, Human Well-Being and Development ====
This FutureLab analyses the role of inequality, human well-being and development for understanding the impacts of and responses to climate change from an economic perspective.

== Partners ==
PIK provides scientific advice to international organizations like the World Bank and the International Monetary Fund, the World Health Organization, the International Organization for Migration as well as to regional bodies like the Federal Government of Germany and the European Commission. PIK scientists also contribute to the reports of the Intergovernmental Panel on Climate Change (IPCC). From 2008 to 2015, the IPCC working group Climate Change mitigation was co-chaired by the institute's co-director and chief economist Ottmar Edenhofer. In the IPCC's sixth assessment cycle (2016–2022) PIK researchers have contributed their expertise to the Special Report on Global Warming of 1.5 °C (2017) and the Special Report on Climate Change and Land (2019). Several PIK researchers are chapter authors for the Sixth Assessment Report (AR6), published in 2021–2022.

PIK's further scientific networks include:

- The Earth League
- The Earth Commission
- Food System Economics Commission
- German Advisory Council on Global Change (WGBU)
- German Advisory Council on the Environment (SRU)
- German National Academy of Sciences Leopoldina
- United Nations Sustainable Development Solutions Network (SDSN)

== Financing ==
PIK is a non-profit and a member of the Leibniz Association and is funded to a roughly equal extent by the Federal Republic of Germany and the Federal State of Brandenburg. In 2020, the institute received around 12.4 million euros in institutional funding. Additional project funding from external sources amounted to around 14.4 million euros, mostly from public sources such as European Union research programmes or the German Research Foundation (Deutsche Forschungsgemeinschaft).

== See also ==
- Climatic Research Unit
- NASA Goddard Institute for Space Studies
- NCAR Community Climate System Model
- Intergovernmental Panel on Climate Change (IPCC)
- Earth for All initiative
