= MAgPIE =

MAgPIE is a non-linear, recursive, dynamic-optimization, global land and water-use model with a cost-minimization objective function. MAgPIE was developed and is employed by the land-use group working at the Potsdam Institute for Climate Impact Research (PIK). It links regional economic information with grid-based biophysical constraints simulated by the dynamic vegetation and hydrology model LPJmL. MAgPIE considers spatially-explicit patterns of production, land use change and water constraints in different world regions, consistently linking economic development with food and energy demand.

== The Model ==
Input data and output parameters of MAgPIE

The model is based on static yield functions in order to model potential crop productivity and its related water use. For the biophysical supply simulation, spatially explicit 0.5° data is aggregated to a consistent number of clusters. Ten world regions represent the demand side of the model. Required calories for the demand categories (food and non-food energy intake) are determined by a cross-sectional country regression based on population and income projections. In order to fulfill the demand, the model allocates 19 cropping and 5 livestock activities to the spatially-explicit land and water resources, subject to resource, management and cost constraints. From 1995 MAgPIE simulates time-steps of 10 years. For each period the optimal land use pattern from the previous period is used as a starting point.

== Demand ==
The demand for agricultural products is fixed for every region and every time-step. The drivers of agricultural demand are: time, income and population growth. Total demand is composed of: food demand, material demand, feed demand and seed demand. Food demand depends on food energy demand, and the share of crop and livestock products in the diet. Within livestock products, the share of different products (Ruminant meat, chicken meat, other meat, milk, eggs) is fixed at 1995 levels. The same is valid for the share of crops within total food calories and material demand. The share of livestock products in the total consumed food calories is an important driver for the land-use sector. Different statistical models are used to estimate plausible future scenarios. A calibration is used to reach the livestock shares of the Food Balance Sheets for 1995 for each region.

Feed for livestock is produced as a mixture of concentrates, fodder, livestock products (e.g. bone meal), pasture, crop residues and conversion by-products (e.g. rapeseed cake) at predefined proportions. These differences in the livestock systems cause different emission levels from livestock.

== Biophysical Inputs ==
The biophysical inputs for the simulations are obtained from the grid-based model LPJmL. The global vegetation model with managed land (LPJmL) also delivers values for water availability and requirements for each grid cell as well as the carbon content of the different vegetation types. Cropland, pasture, and irrigation water are fixed inputs in limited supply in each grid cell.

== Cost Types ==
MAgPIE takes four different cost types into account: production costs for crop and livestock production, investments in technological change, land conversion costs and intra-regional transport costs. By minimizing these four cost components on a global scale for the current time step, the model solution is obtained. Production costs in MAgPIE imply costs for labor, capital and intermediate inputs. They are specific for all crop and livestock types and are implemented as costs per area for crops (US$/ha) and costs per production unit of livestock (US$/ton).

MAgPIE has two options to increase total production in agriculture at additional costs: land expansion and intensification. In MAgPIE the latter can be achieved by investments in technological change (TC). Investing in technological change triggers yield increases which lead then to a higher total production. At the same time the corresponding increases in agricultural land-use intensity raises costs for further yield increases. The reason is that intensification on land which is already used intensively is more expensive than intensification on extensively-used land.

To increase production another alternative is to expand cropland into non-agricultural land. The conversion causes additional costs for the preparation of new land and basic infrastructure investments, which are also taken into account. Intraregional transport costs arise for each commodity unit as a function of the distance to intraregional markets and therefore restrict land expansion in MAgPIE. This depends on the quality and accessibility of infrastructure. Intra-regional transport costs are higher for less accessible areas than for more accessible regions. This leads to higher overall costs of cropland expansion in those cases.
