= Sergei Scherbov =

- Education: Moscow University of Aviation; (1975); All-Union Research Institute for Systems Studies of the USSR Academy of Sciences (1983)
- Scientific career
- Fields: Demographic analysis; Population projection
- Workplaces: International Institute for Applied Systems Analysis; Vienna Institute of Demography; Wittgenstein Centre for Demography and Global Human Capital

Sergei Scherbov (born 1952) is a demographer specializing in demographic analysis and population projection. He is deputy program leader with the World Population Program (POP) at IIASA (International Institute for Applied Systems Analysis) since 2013 and leader of the Population Dynamics and Forecasting Group at the Vienna Institute of Demography of the Austrian Academy of Sciences since 2002.

From 1993 to 2002, Scherbov was a researcher and lecturer at the Population Research Centre, at the University of Groningen. He worked on the issues of population projections and development of software for population studies at IIASA since 1986, is leading scientist at the institute since 1992 and project leader since 2013. He is further director of demographic analysis at the Wittgenstein Centre for Demography and Global Human Capital since 2011 and guest professor at the WU-Vienna University of Economics and Business.

Scherbov holds a Ph.D. in theory of systems, control theory and systems analysis from All-Union Research Institute for Systems Studies of the USSR Academy of Sciences, Moscow, Russia (1983).

Scherbov has worked on demographic modeling, probabilistic population projections, applications of multistate demography, data processing and presentation, measuring aging in ways that take life expectancy change into account, and modeling of disability. He has done much research on the demography of the former Soviet Union. Scherbov is author, co-author, or co-editor of several books as well as numerous articles published in professional journals, including Nature, Science, and Population and Development Review.

Based on this research in 2012 he received a European Research Council ERC-Advanced Grant to develop new approaches to the study of age and ageing that are appropriate for 21st century conditions. Among other things, the project will ascertain the extent to which advanced societies are actually ageing in multiple dimensions, including health, cognitive abilities, and longevity. By addressing such fundamental issues this project will likely have a pronounced impact on future population ageing research.

== Selected publications ==
- Marois, Guillaume; Muttarak, Raya; Scherbov, Sergei (2020). "Assessing the potential impact of COVID-19 on life expectancy". PLOS ONE. 15 (9) e0238678. Bibcode:2020PLoSO..1538678M. doi:10.1371/journal.pone.0238678. PMC 7498023. PMID 32941467.
- Gietel-Basten, Stuart; Saucedo, Silvia E. Giorguli; Scherbov, Sergei (2020). "Prospective measures of aging for Central and South America". PLOS ONE. 15 (7) e0236280. Bibcode:2020PLoSO..1536280G. doi:10.1371/journal.pone.0236280. PMC 7380630. PMID 32706837.
- Weber, Daniela; Scherbov, Sergei (2020). "Prospects of activity limitations among older adults in 23 low and middle income countries". Scientific Reports. 10 (1) 10442. Bibcode:2020NatSR..1010442W. doi:10.1038/s41598-020-67166-4. PMC 7319965. PMID 32591610.
- Sanderson, Warren C.; Scherbov, Sergei (2020). "Choosing between the UN's alternative views of population aging". PLOS ONE. 15 (7) e0233602. Bibcode:2020PLoSO..1533602S. doi:10.1371/journal.pone.0233602. PMC 7343128. PMID 32639958.
- Philipov, Dimiter; Scherbov, Sergei (2020). "Subjective length of life of European individuals at older ages: Temporal and gender distinctions". PLOS ONE. 15 (3) e0229975. Bibcode:2020PLoSO..1529975P. doi:10.1371/journal.pone.0229975. PMC 7077847. PMID 32182263.
- Sanderson, W.C., Scherbov S. (2019). Prospective Longevity: A New Vision of Population Aging. Cambridge, MA: Harvard University Press.
- Ghislandi, Simone; Sanderson, Warren C.; Scherbov, Sergei (2019). "A Simple Measure of Human Development: The Human Life Indicator". Population and Development Review. 45 (1): 219–233. doi:10.1111/padr.12205. PMC 6472489. PMID 31007310.
- Sanderson, Warren C.; Scherbov, Sergei (2015). "Are We Overly Dependent on Conventional Dependency Ratios?". Population and Development Review. 41 (4): 687–708. doi:10.1111/j.1728-4457.2015.00091.x.
- Sanderson, W.C.; Scherbov, S. (2013). "The characteristics approach to the measurement of population aging" (PDF). Population and Development Review. 39 (4): 673–685. doi:10.1111/j.1728-4457.2013.00633.x.
- Scherbov, S.; Lutz, W.; Sanderson, W.C. (2011). "The uncertain timing of reaching 8 billion, peak world population, and other demographic milestones". Population and Development Review. 37 (3): 571–578. doi:10.1111/j.1728-4457.2011.00435.x. PMID 22167816.
- Sanderson, W.C.; Scherbov, S. (2010). "Remeasuring Aging". Science. 329 (5997): 1287–1288. Bibcode:2010Sci...329.1287S. doi:10.1126/science.1193647. PMID 20829469. S2CID 206528241.
- Lutz, W.; Scherbov, S. (2008). "The coming acceleration of global population ageing". Nature. 451 (7179): 716–719. Bibcode:2008Natur.451..716L. doi:10.1038/nature06516. PMID 18204438. S2CID 4379499.
- Sanderson, W.C.; Scherbov, S. (2007). "A near electoral majority of pensioners: Prospects and policies" (PDF). Population and Development Review. 33 (3): 543–554. doi:10.1111/j.1728-4457.2007.00184.x.
- Sanderson, W.C.; Scherbov, S. (2005). "Average remaining lifetimes can increase as human populations age" (PDF). Nature. 435 (7043): 811–813. Bibcode:2005Natur.435..811S. doi:10.1038/nature03593. PMID 15944703. S2CID 4323183.
- Lutz, W.; Sanderson, W.C.; Scherbov, S., eds. (2004). The End of World Population Growth in the 21st Century: New Challenges for Human Capital Formation and Sustainable Development. London: Earthscan.
- Goldstein, J.; Lutz, W.; Scherbov, S. (2003). "Long-term population decline in Europe: The relative importance of tempo effects and generational length" (PDF). Population and Development Review. 29 (4): 699–707. doi:10.1111/j.1728-4457.2003.00699.x.
- Lutz, W.; O'Neill, B.C.; Scherbov, S. (2003). "Europe's population at a turning point" (PDF). Science. 299 (5615): 1991–1992. Bibcode:2003Sci...299.1991L. doi:10.1126/science.1080316. PMID 12663901. S2CID 1700.
- Lutz, W.; Sanderson, W.C.; Scherbov, S. (2001). "The end of world population growth" (PDF). Nature. 412 (6846): 543–545. Bibcode:2001Natur.412..543L. doi:10.1038/35087589. PMID 11484054. S2CID 4425080.
- O'Neill, B.C.; Scherbov, S.; Lutz, W. (1999). "The long-term effect of the timing of fertility decline on population size". Population and Development Review. 25 (4): 749–756. doi:10.1111/j.1728-4457.1999.00749.x.
- Scherbov, S.; van Vianen, H. (1999). "Marital and fertility careers of Russian women born between 1910 and 1935". Population and Development Review. 25 (1): 129–143. doi:10.1023/A:1011820132402. PMID 22053408. S2CID 154249270.
- Lutz, W.; Sanderson, W.C.; Scherbov, S. (1998). "Expert-based probabilistic population projections". Population and Development Review. 24 (Supplementary Issue: Frontiers of Population Forecasting): 139–155. doi:10.2307/2808054. JSTOR 2808054.
- Lutz, W.; Sanderson, W.C.; Scherbov, S. (1997). "Doubling of world population unlikely" (PDF). Nature. 387 (6635): 803–805. Bibcode:1997Natur.387..803L. doi:10.1038/42935. PMID 9194559. S2CID 4306159.
