= Richard Gisser =

Austrian demographer

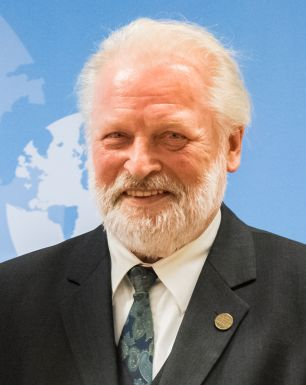
- Born: July 11, 1939 (age 87); Vienna
- Citizenship: Austrian
- Education: University of Vienna
- Awards: Austrian Decoration for Science and Art (2015)
- Scientific career
- Fields: Historical demography of Austria; Social and demographic statistics Trends and projections of population development Fertility and population policy
- Workplaces: Statistik Austria; Vienna Institute of Demography; Wittgenstein Centre for Demography and Global Human Capital

Richard Gisser (born 11 July 1939, in Vienna) is an Austrian demographer who held leading positions at his country's statistical office until his retirement. He was also the long-time director, then deputy director, of the Vienna Institute of Demography at the Austrian Academy of Sciences.

== Biography ==
Richard Gisser, born on World Population Day, grew up in Lower Austria, finishing high school in 1957. He studied sociology and human geography at the University of Vienna where he received his Ph.D. in 1975 with a doctoral thesis on migration to Vienna. In 1976, he also passed the Staatsexamen in official statistics.

After completing his studies, he did research at the Austrian Institute for Spatial Planning (1964-1968) before changing to the Austrian statistical office (today's Statistik Austria) in 1969. While there, he held a number of leading positions such as director of the Population Statistics Department from 1985 to 2001, until his retirement in 2002. He continues to be a member of the Austrian Statistical Society where he organizes the Demography working group.

Since 1977, Gisser worked at the Austrian Institute for Demography (Institut für Demographie/IfD), as head of the department for Applied Demographic Research. He then became director of this research unit of the Austrian Academy of Sciences (ÖAW) between 1987 and 2001 (with one brief pause). After the institute was restructured to form the Vienna Institute of Demography (VID) under the lead of Wolfgang Lutz, Gisser became deputy director (until 2017) and head of the research group on Demography of Austria. Since 2010, VID has been part of the Wittgenstein Centre for Demography and Global Human Capital---a research collaboration project whose other partners are IIASA (International Institute for Applied Systems Analysis) and WU/Vienna University of Economics and Business.

Gisser held appointments with various population policy commissions of ÖAW and taught demography at the University of Vienna from 1988 to 2001.

He is the long-time editor-in-chief of Statistische Nachrichten, the monthly bulletin of the Austrian statistical office, and has been on the editing boards of VID's Vienna Yearbook of Population Research since 2003 and of Demografie/Prague since 2013.

In the past decades, Gisser was a permanent delegate for the Austrian government at the European Population Committee of the Council of Europe in Strasbourg (1977-2005). He was also a partner in international research collaborations, taking part in international conferences on population development and as an invited expert on demographic and statistic topics. He has organized several international expert meetings and published in journals relevant to the field.

Gisser's main research topics are the historical demography of Austria, demographic and social statistics, trends and projections of population development as well as the resulting implications for policy measures.

He is married and has three children.

Today, his parental home, the "Gisser villa" in Ernstbrunn, is the administrative centre of the Wolf Science Center (WSC).

== Memberships ==
International Union for the Scientific Study of Population (IUSSP)
European Association for Population Studies (EAPS)
Deutsche Gesellschaft für Demographie (DGD)
Austrian Statistical Society (organizer of the Demography department)

== Notable awards ==
2015 Austrian Cross of Honour for Science and Art, First Class
2004 Bene Merito decoration awarded by the Austrian Academy of Sciences
1987 Decoration of Honour for Services to the Republic of Austria

== Publications (selection) ==
- Johannes Klotz and Richard Gisser: Mortality Differentials by Religious Denomination in Vienna 1981-2002, VID Working Paper 8/2015
- Richard Gisser and Dalkhat Ediev: Österreichs Familien 2032 – neue Aspekte [Families in Austria 2032]. In: Wolfgang Lutz, Helmut Strasser (Hrsg.) Österreich 2032. Festschrift zum 80. Geburtstag von Gerhart Bruckmann [Austria 2032 – commemorative volume on the occasion of Gerhart Bruckmann's 80th birthday]. Schriftenreihe des Instituts für Demographie der Österreichischen Akademie der Wissenschaften, Bd. 22, 63-102. Vienna (2012).
- Richard Gisser: New Migration Flow Statistics in Austria (Methods, Problems and Outcomes). Working Paper for the Joint ECE/EUROSTAT Work Session on Migration Statistics, Geneva, 8–10 May 2000.
- Richard Gisser: Wirkungen geburtenfördernder Maßnahmen [Effects of family policy measures]. In: Richard Gisser, Ludwig Reiter, Helmuth Schattovits and Liselotte Wilk (Hrsg.): Lebenswelt Familie [Living environment: the family], 641-647. Wien (1990).
- Charlotte Höhn, Karl Martin Bolte, Richard Gisser, Jürg A. Hauser and Ralf Hußmanns: Mehrsprachiges Demographisches Wörterbuch, deutschsprachige Fassung [Multilingual Dictionary of Demography, German version]. Schriftenreihe des Bundesinstituts für Bevölkerungsforschung, Sonderbd. 16. Boppard am Rhein (1987). Online version available
- Richard Gisser: Daten zur Bevölkerungsentwicklung der österreichischen Alpenländer 1819-1913 [Data on the demographic development of the Austrian Alpine regions, 1819-1913]. In: Österreichisches Statistisches Zentralamt (Hrsg.) Geschichte und Ergebnisse der zentralen amtlichen Statistik in Österreich 1829-1979 [History and results of the central official statistics, 1829-1979]. Beiträge zur Österreichischen Statistik 550: 403-424, und Tabellenanhang (Beiträge Heft 550A), 23-31. Wien: Österreichisches Statistisches Zentralamt (1979).

== See also ==
- Survey of Health, Ageing and Retirement in Europe
