= Human population projections =

Estimated global human population

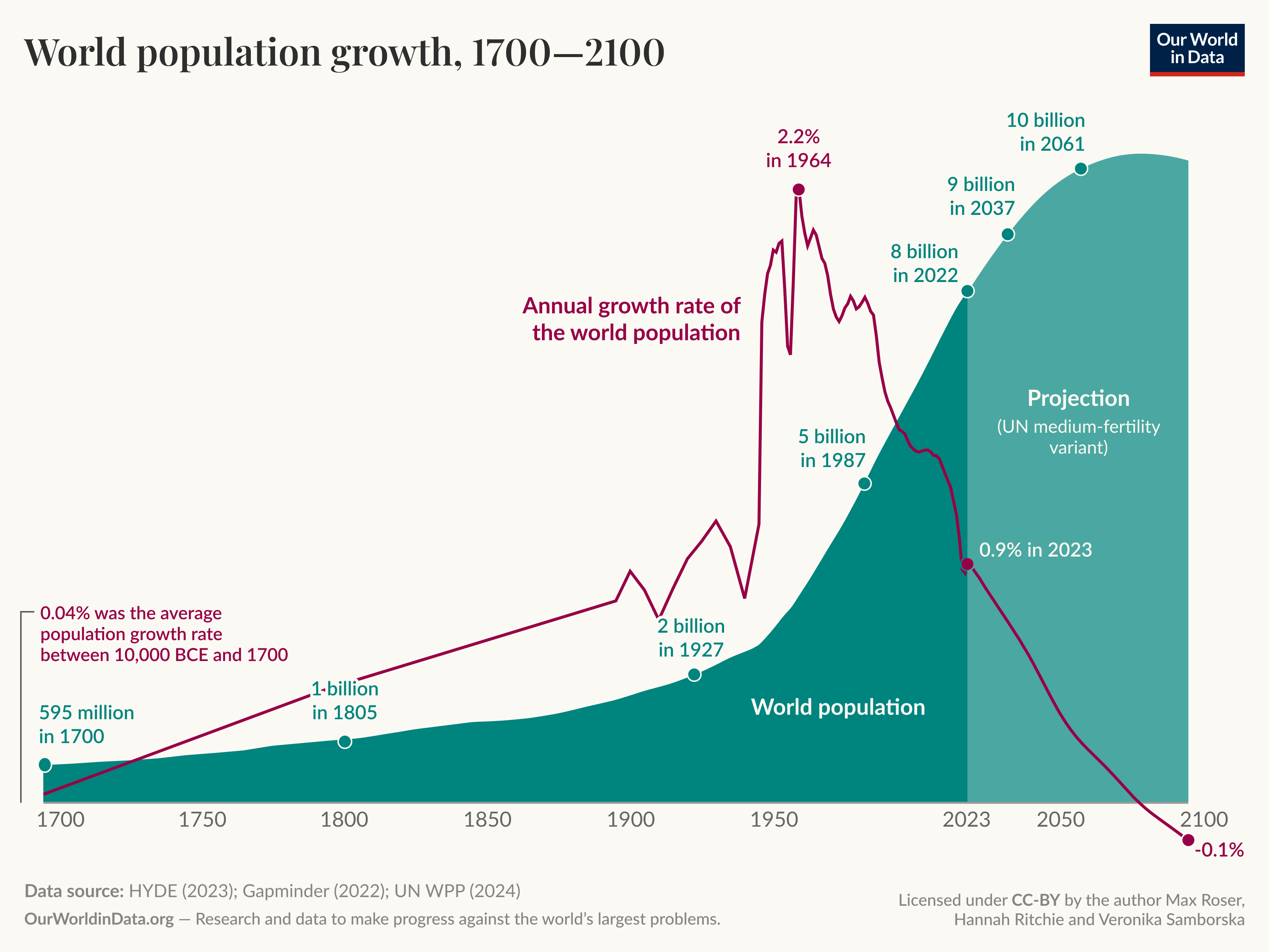
1. World population growth 1700–2100, 2024 projection

Human population projections are attempts to show how human populations might change in the future. These projections are an important input to forecasts of the population's impact on the planet and humanity's future well-being. Models of population growth take trends in human development and apply projections into the future. These models use trend-based-assumptions about how populations will respond to economic, social and technological forces to understand how they will affect fertility and mortality, and thus population growth.

The 2022 projections from the United Nations Population Division (UN) (chart #1) show that annual world population growth peaked at 2.2% per year in 1964, has since dropped to 0.9% in 2023, equivalent to about 74 million people each year, and could drop even further to minus 0.1% by 2100. Based on this, the UN projected that the world population, 8 billion as of 2023, would peak around the year 2084 at about 10.3 billion, and then start a slow decline, assuming a continuing decrease in the global average fertility rate from 2.5 births per woman during the 2015–2020 period to 1.8 by the year 2100 (the medium-variant projection).

However, estimates outside of the United Nations have put forward alternative models based on additional downward pressure on fertility (such as successful implementation of education and family planning goals in the United Nations' Sustainable Development Goals) which could result in peak population during the 2060–2070 period rather than later.

According to the UN, all of the predicted growth in world population between 2020 and 2050 will come from less developed countries and more than half will come from sub-Saharan Africa. Half of the growth will come from just eight countries, five of which are in Africa. The UN predicts that the population of sub-Saharan Africa will double by 2050. The Pew Research Center observes that 50% of births in the year 2100 will be in Africa. Other organizations project lower levels of population growth in Africa, based particularly on improvement in women's education and successful implementation of family planning.

2. World Population Prospects, 2022 projection

During the remainder of this century, some countries will see population growth and some will see population decline. For example, the UN projects that Nigeria will gain about 340 million people, about the present population of the US, to become the third most populous country, and China will lose about half of its population.

Even though the global fertility rate continues to fall, chart #2 shows that because of population momentum the global population will continue to grow, although at a steadily slower rate, until the mid-2080s (the median line).

The main driver of long-term future population growth is projected to be the continuing evolution of fertility and mortality.

== History of population projections ==
Projections of global human population are generally based on birth rates and death rates, and since these are difficult to predict very far into the future, forecasts of global population numbers and growth rates have changed over time.

=== 20th century ===
Walter Greiling projected in the 1950s that world population would reach a peak of about nine billion in the 21st century and then stop growing after an improvement in public health in less developed countries.

In 1983, astrophysicist Brandon Carter developed the Doomsday Argument, a probabilistic argument that postulates it is unlikely for humans born today to be randomly selected at an early position in the ordering of all humans who will ever live. In the original formulation, there is a 95% chance that the total number of humans will be less than 1.2 trillion and that extinction will occur before the year 9120.

In 1992, the United Nations published five projections of long-term world population growth. According to their medium projection, the world population would grow to 10.0 billion by 2050, 11.2 billion by 2100, and 10.8 billion by 2150.

=== 21st century ===
Projected world population by 2100 based on the 2019 UN medium population scenario

Estimates published in the early 2000s tended to predict that the population of Earth would stop increasing around 2070. For example, in a 2004 long-term prospective report, the United Nations Population Division projected that world population would peak at 9.2 billion in 2075 and then stabilize at a value close to 9 billion out to as far as the year 2300.

Jørgen Randers, one of the authors of the seminal 1972 long-term simulations in The Limits to Growth, offered an alternative scenario in a 2012 book, arguing that traditional projections insufficiently take into account the downward impact of global urbanization on fertility. Randers' "most likely scenario" predicted a peak in world population in the early 2040s at about 8.1 billion people, followed by decline.

In 2012, the UN changed its prediction to the effect that no maximum would likely be reached in the 21st century, and that by the year 2100 world population would increase to somewhere in the range 9.6 to 12.3 billion with 10.9 billion being the midpoint of that range. The main reason for the revision was a recognition that the high fertility rate in Africa was not declining as fast as had been previously assumed.

World population since 1800 in billions. Data from the 2019 United Nations projections.

Another 2014 paper by demographers from several universities, using data from the UN's 2014 report and their own statistical methods, forecast that the world's population would reach about 10.9 billion in 2100 and continue growing thereafter.

In 2017 the UN predicted that global population would reach 11.2 billion by 2100 and still be growing then at the rate of 0.1% per year. In 2019 it was updated to 10.9 billion by 2100 and still growing.

The 2022 revision of the UN's World Population Prospects report represents a departure from the pattern of the previous ten years, it was the first to project a peak in the 21st century. It expected that a slowing of the population growth rate will lead to a population peak of 10.4 billion in 2086 in the medium scenario, after which it would then begin to slowly fall. This shift from earlier projections of peak population and predicted date of zero population growth comes from a more rapid drop in Africa's birth rate than previous projections had expected. For example, the 2012 report predicted that the population of Nigeria, Africa's most populous country, would rise to 914 million by 2100; the 2022 report lowers that to 546 million, a reduction of 368 million; the 2024 report lowered that further to 477 million, a reduction of 69 million. Jose Rimon of Johns Hopkins University suggested, "We have been underestimating what is happening in terms of fertility change in Africa. Africa will probably undergo the same kind of rapid changes as east Asia did." The 2024 edition brought the peak forward to 2084, with the population topping at 10.3 billion.

A table based on UN World Population Prospects reports, using the medium fertility scenario:

Revision year	Peak population year	Peak population, billion	Population in 2100, billion
2004	2075	9.2	9.1
2012	2100s		10.9
2015	2100s		11.2
2017	2100s		11.2
2019	2100s		10.9
2022	2086	10.4	10.4
2024	2084	10.3	10.2

== Drivers of population change ==
The population of a country or area grows or declines through the interaction of three demographic drivers: fertility, mortality, and migration.

=== Fertility ===
Map of countries by total fertility rate (2022–2023), referring to the average number of children that are born to a woman over her lifetime, according to the Population Reference Bureau

Fertility is expressed as the total fertility rate (TFR), a measure of the number of children on average that a woman will bear in her lifetime. With longevity trending towards uniform and stable values worldwide, the main driver of future population growth will be the evolution of the fertility rate. In regions where fertility is relatively high, demographers generally assume that fertility will decline and eventually stabilize at about two children per woman.

During the period 2015–2020, the average world fertility rate was 2.1 children per woman, about half the level in 1950–1955 (5 children per woman). In the medium variant, global fertility is projected to decline further to 2.0 in 2045–2050 and to 1.8 in 2095–2100.

=== Mortality ===
Mortality rate, or death rate, is a measure of the number of deaths in a particular population, scaled to the size of that population, per unit of time. If the mortality rate is relatively high and the resulting life expectancy is therefore relatively low, changes in mortality can have a material impact on population growth. When the mortality rate is low and life expectancy is relatively high, a change in mortality has much less of an effect.

Because child mortality has declined substantially over the last several decades, global life expectancy at birth, has risen from 47 years in 1950 to 71 years in 2021 and is expected to keep rising to reach 82 years in 2100. In the more developed regions, life expectancy has risen from 64 years in 1950 to 78 years in 2021 and is projected to reach 90 in 2100. Among the less developed countries, life expectancy has risen from 41 years in 1950 to 70 years in 2021 and is expected to rise to 81 years by 2100.

=== Migration ===
Migration can have a significant effect on population change. Global south–south migration accounts for 38% of total migration, and global south–north for 34%. For example, the United Nations reports that during the period 2010–2020, fourteen countries will have seen a net inflow of more than one million migrants, while ten countries will have seen a net outflow of similar proportions. The largest migratory outflows have been in response to demand for workers in other countries (Bangladesh, Nepal, and the Philippines) or to insecurity in the home country (Myanmar, Syria, and Venezuela). Belarus, Estonia, Germany, Hungary, Italy, Japan, Russia, Serbia, and Ukraine have experienced a net inflow of migrants over the decade, helping to offset population losses caused by a negative natural increase (births minus deaths).

== World population projections ==
Estimates of population levels in different continents between 1950 and 2050, according to the United Nations (2011 edition). The vertical axis is logarithmic and is in millions of people.

This section describes near-term population changes, up to the year 2050, and long-term population changes, out to the year 2100.

=== Up to 2050 ===
The median scenario of the UN's 2022 World Population Prospects predicts the following populations by region in 2050 compared to population in 2000 and shows the differing growth rates for each over the first half of this century.

Projected regional population (billions)
	2000	2050	Growth
Asia	3.72	5.28	+42%
Africa	0.82	2.47	+201%
Europe	0.73	0.70	-4%
Latin America & the Caribbean	0.52	0.73	+40%
Northern America (Note: Northern America consists of Bermuda, Canada, Greenland, Saint Pierre and Miquelon, and the United States.)	0.31	0.43	+39%
Oceania	0.03	0.06	+100%
World	6.13	9.66	+58%

UN estimates (as of 2024) for world population by continent in 2000 and in 2050 (pie chart area to scale): Asia Africa Europe Latin America Northern America Oceania

=== After 2050 ===
Projections of population beyond the year 2050 tend to vary depending on the organization making them because each make their own assumptions of the drivers of population change: fertility, mortality and migration.

==== United Nations projections ====
The UN Population Division report of 2022 projects world population to continue growing after 2050, although at a steadily decreasing rate, to peak at 10.4 billion in 2086, and then to start a slow decline to about 10.3 billion in 2100 with a growth rate at that time of -0.1%.

This projected growth of population, like all others, depends on assumptions about vital rates. For example, the chart below shows that the UN Population Division assumes that the total fertility rate (TFR), which has been steadily declining since 1963, will continue to decline, at varying paces depending on circumstances in individual regions, to a below-replacement level of 1.8 by 2100. Between now (2020) and 2100, regions with a TFR currently below this rate, for example Europe, will see their TFR rise. Regions with a TFR above this rate will see their TFR continue to decline.

Total Fertility Rate for Six Regions and the World, 1950–2100

==== Other projections ====
Other organizations have published different forecasts.

- A 2020 study published by The Lancet from researchers funded by the Global Burden of Disease Study promotes a lower growth scenario, projecting that world population will peak in 2064 at 9.73 billion and then decline to 8.8 billion in 2100. This projection assumes further advancement of women's rights globally. In this case, the TFR is assumed to decline more rapidly than the UN's projection, to reach 1.7 in 2100.
- An analysis from the Wittgenstein Center predicts global population to peak in 2070 at 9.4 billion and then decline to 9.0 billion in 2100.
- The Institute for Health Metrics and Evaluation (IHME) and the International Institute for Applied Systems Analysis (IIASA) project lower fertility in Sub-Saharan Africa (SSA) in 2100 than the UN. By 2100, the UN projects the population in SSA will reach 3.8 billion, IHME projects 3.1 billion, and IIASA projects 2.6 billion. IHME and IIASA incorporate women's educational attainment in their models of fertility, and in the case of IHME, also consider met need for family planning.

Other assumptions can produce other results. Some of the authors of the 2004 UN report assumed that life expectancy would rise slowly and continuously. The projections in the report assume this with no upper limit, though at a slowing pace depending on circumstances in individual countries. By 2100, the report assumed life expectancy to be from 66 to 97 years, and by 2300 from 87 to 106 years, depending on the country. Based on that assumption, they expect that rising life expectancy will produce small but continuing population growth by the end of the projections, ranging from 0.03 to 0.07 percent annually. The hypothetical feasibility (and wide availability) of life extension by technological means would further contribute to long term (beyond 2100) population growth.

Evolutionary biology also suggests that the demographic transition may reverse itself and global population may continue to grow in the long term. Some researchers, such as Jane N. O'Sullivan, contend that many recent population projections have underestimated population growth. She notes that in the last decades, "support for family planning has waned, and global fertility decline has decelerated as a result". Some scholars have argued that a form of "cultural selection" may be occurring due to significant differences in fertility rates between cultures, and it can therefore be expected that fertility rates and rates of population growth may rise again in the future. An example is certain religious groups that have a higher birth rate that is not accounted for by differences in income. In his book Shall the Religious Inherit the Earth?, Eric Kaufmann argues that demographic trends point to religious fundamentalists increasing as a share of the population over the next century. From the perspective of evolutionary psychology, it is expected that selection pressure should occur for whatever psychological or cultural traits maximize fertility.

== Growth regions ==
The table below shows that from 2020 to 2050 and beyond to 2100, the bulk of the world's population growth is projected to take place in Africa. Of the additional 1.9 billion people projected between 2020 and 2050, 1.2 billion will be added in Africa, 0.7 billion in Asia and zero in the rest of the world. Africa's share of global population is projected to grow from 17% in 2020 to 25% in 2050 and 38% by 2100, while the share of Asia will fall from 60% in 2020 to 55% in 2050 and 45% in 2100. The strong growth of the African population will happen regardless of the rate of decrease of fertility, because of the high proportion of young people already living today, who are in, or approaching, their fertile years. For example, the UN projects that the population of Nigeria will surpass that of the United States by about 2050.

Projected regional populations
Region	2020		2050		Change 2020–50 (bn)	2100		Change 2020–2100 (bn)
Region	bn	% of Total	bn	% of Total	Change 2020–50 (bn)	bn	% of Total	Change 2020–2100 (bn)
Africa	1.3	17	2.5	25	+1.2	3.9	38	+2.6
Asia	4.6	60	5.3	55	+0.7	4.7	45	+0.1
Other	1.9	23	1.9	20	0.0	1.8	17	-0.1
More Developed	1.3	17	1.3	13	0.0	1.2	12	-0.1
Less Developed	6.5	83	8.4	87	+1.9	9.2	88	+2.7
World	7.8	100	9.7	100	+1.9	10.4	100	+2.6

The population of the More Developed regions is slated to remain mostly unchanged, at 1.2–1.3 billion for the remainder of the 21st century. All population growth comes from the Less Developed regions.

The table below breaks out the UN's future population growth predictions by region

Projected annual % changes in population for three periods in the future
Region	2020–25 (%/yr)	2045–50 (%/yr)	2095–2100 (%/yr)
Africa	2.5	1.7	0.4
Asia	0.7	0.2	-0.2
Europe	-0.1	−0.3	−0.3
Latin America & the Caribbean	0.7	0.2	−0.5
Northern America	0.5	0.2	0.1
Oceania	1.2	0.7	0.2
World	0.9	0.5	-0.1

The UN projects that between 2020 and 2100 there will be declines in population growth in all six regions, that by 2100 three of them will be undergoing population decline, and the world will have entered a period of global population decline.

== Most populous nations by 2050 and 2100 ==
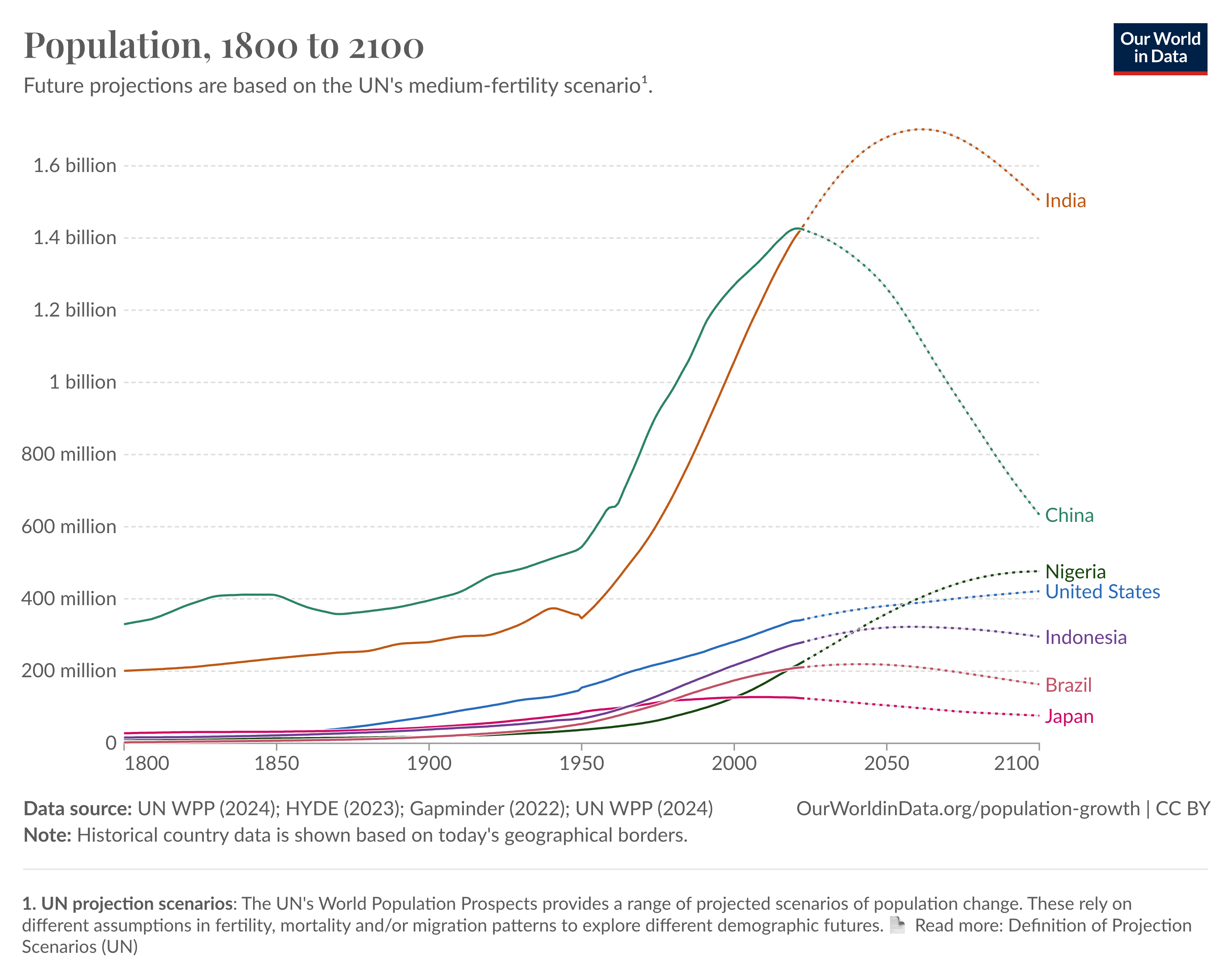
Population of the present-day top seven most-populous countries, 1800 to 2100. Future projections are based on the 2024 UN's medium-fertility scenario. Chart created by Our World In Data in 2024.

The UN Population Division has calculated the future population of the world's countries, based on current demographic trends. The UN's 2024 report projects world population to be 8.1 billion in 2024, about 9.6 billion in 2050, and about 10.2 billion in 2100. The following table shows the largest 15 countries by population as of 2024, 2050 and 2100 to show how the rankings will change between now and the end of this century.

World Population Share Projections (2024): 1. India (17.8%); 2. China (17.4%); 3. United States (4.23%); 4. Indonesia (3.47%); 5. Pakistan (3.08%); 6. Nigeria (2.85%); 7. Brazil (2.60%); 8. Bangladesh (2.13%); 9. Russia (1.78%); 10. Ethiopia (1.62%)	World Population Share Projections (2050): 1. India (17.4%); 2. China (14.1%); 3. United States (3.94%); 4. Indonesia (3.31%); 5. Pakistan (3.85%); 6. Nigeria (3.71%); 7. Brazil (2.25%); 8. Bangladesh (2.22%); 9. Russia (1.41%); 10. Ethiopia (2.33%)	World Population Share Projections (2100): 1. India (14.8%); 2. China (6.22%); 3. United States (4.14%); 4. Indonesia (2.91%); 5. Pakistan (5.02%); 6. Nigeria (4.69%); 7. Brazil (1.60%); 8. Bangladesh (2.05%); 9. Russia (1.24%); 10. Ethiopia (3.61%)

Projected population growth of the top 15 countries in 2024, 2050, and 2100
Country	Population (millions)			Rank		
Country	2024	2050	2100	2024	2050	2100
India	1,451	1,680	1,505	1	1	1
China	1,419	1,360	633	2	2	2
Pakistan	251	372	511	5	4	3
Nigeria	233	359	477	6	5	4
Democratic Republic of the Congo	109	218	431	15	8	5
United States	345	381	421	3	3	6
Ethiopia	132	225	367	10	7	7
Indonesia	283	320	296	4	6	8
Tanzania	69	130	263	22	15	9
Bangladesh	174	215	209	8	10	10
Egypt	117	162	202	13	11	11
Brazil	212	217	163	7	9	12
Angola	38	74	150	42	27	13
Sudan	50	85	137	30	21	14
Mexico	131	149	130	11	12	15
Russian Federation	145	136	126	9	13	17
Philippines	115	134	114	14	14	19
Japan	124	105	77	12	17	32
World	8,162	9,664	10,180			

From 2024 to 2050, the eight highlighted countries are expected to account for about half of the world's projected population increase: India, Nigeria, the Democratic Republic of the Congo, Pakistan, Ethiopia, Tanzania, Egypt, and Indonesia.

== Population projections of the largest metropolitan areas ==
Large urban areas are hubs of economic development and innovation, with larger cities underpinning regional economies and local and global sustainability initiatives. As of 2016, 757 million people live in the 101 largest cities; these cities are home to 11% of the world's population. By the end of the century, the world population is projected to grow, with estimates ranging from 6.9 billion to 13.1 billion; the percentage of people living in the 101 largest cities is estimated to be 15% to 23%.

The following are the 30 metropolitan areas with the largest population in 2025, and the projections for the years 2050, 2075, and 2100, according to the European Commission's Global Human Settlement Layer.

Projected populations in millions
Rank	City	Pop. 2025	City	Pop. 2050	City	Pop. 2075	City	Pop. 2100
1	(Indonesia) Jakarta	41.91	(Bangladesh) Dhaka	52.12	(Bangladesh) Dhaka	57.87	(Bangladesh) Dhaka	55.01
2	(Bangladesh) Dhaka	36.59	(Indonesia) Jakarta	51.78	(Indonesia) Jakarta	52.94	(Indonesia) Jakarta	49.70
3	(Japan) Tokyo	33.41	(China) Shanghai	34.91	(Pakistan) Karachi	40.75	(Pakistan) Karachi	43.69
4	(India) Delhi	30.22	(India) Delhi	33.89	(Egypt) Cairo	35.73	(Egypt) Cairo	36.75
5	(China) Shanghai	29.56	(Pakistan) Karachi	32.59	(India) Delhi	34.16	(India) Delhi	31.97
6	(China) Guangzhou	27.56	(Egypt) Cairo	32.37	(China) Shanghai	31.77	(Angola) Luanda	30.65
7	(Egypt) Cairo	25.57	(Japan) Tokyo	30.66	(Angola) Luanda	27.32	(Pakistan) Lahore	24.76
8	(Philippines) Manila	24.74	(China) Guangzhou	29.24	(Japan) Tokyo	26.64	(China) Shanghai	24.67
9	(India) Kolkata	22.55	(Philippines) Manila	27.12	(Philippines) Manila	25.83	(Japan) Tokyo	24.07
10	(South Korea) Seoul	22.49	(India) Kolkata	23.77	(China) Guangzhou	24.78	(Philippines) Manila	22.41
11	(Pakistan) Karachi	21.42	(India) Mumbai	23.06	(Pakistan) Lahore	23.70	(India) Mumbai	21.51
12	(India) Mumbai	20.20	(South Korea) Seoul	21.22	(India) Mumbai	23.09	(India) Kolkata	20.46
13	(Brazil) São Paulo	18.95	(Thailand) Bangkok	20.46	(India) Kolkata	22.79	(Tanzania) Dar es Salaam	20.05
14	(Thailand) Bangkok	18.18	(Pakistan) Lahore	20.39	(Thailand) Bangkok	19.36	(China) Guangzhou	18.09
15	Mexico City	17.73	(Angola) Luanda	20.29	(Vietnam) Ho Chi Minh City	17.89	(Nigeria) Lagos	17.92
16	(China) Beijing	17.01	(Brazil) São Paulo	18.22	(Nigeria) Lagos	17.84	(Thailand) Bangkok	17.56
17	(Pakistan) Lahore	15.16	(China) Beijing	18.00	(Tanzania) Dar es Salaam	17.48	(Vietnam) Ho Chi Minh City	17.08
18	(Turkey) Istanbul	15.01	Mexico City	17.68	Mexico City	16.25	(Russia) Moscow	16.3
19	(Russia) Moscow	14.52	(Vietnam) Ho Chi Minh City	17.20	(South Korea) Seoul	16.12	(Democratic Republic of the Congo) Kinshasa	14.86
20	(Vietnam) Ho Chi Minh City	14.05	(Turkey) Istanbul	16.30	(Russia) Moscow	15.89	(United States) Los Angeles	14.69
21	(Argentina) Buenos Aires	14.02	(Nigeria) Lagos	16.18	(Brazil) São Paulo	15.65	(Ivory Coast) Abidjan	14.61
22	(United States) New York City	13.92	(Russia) Moscow	15.52	(China) Beijing	15.37	(Ethiopia) Addis Ababa	14.42
23	(China) Shenzhen	13.19	(China) Shenzhen	14.66	(Turkey) Istanbul	15.12	Mexico City	14.16
24	(India) Bengaluru	13.19	(India) Bengaluru	14.26	(India) Hajipur	14.88	(India) Hajipur	13.94
25	(Japan) Osaka	12.96	(Argentina) Buenos Aires	14.24	(United States) Los Angeles	14.38	(Cameroon) Yaoundé	13.23
26	(Nigeria) Lagos	12.79	(United States) Los Angeles	13.86	(Democratic Republic of the Congo) Kinshasa	14.36	(India) Bengaluru	13.08
27	(United States) Los Angeles	12.74	(India) Hajipur	13.22	(India) Bengaluru	14.07	(Brazil) São Paulo	12.74
28	(Angola) Luanda	11.37	(United States) New York City	13.22	(Ethiopia) Addis Ababa	13.26	(Turkey) Istanbul	12.48
29	(India) Chennai	11.15	(Democratic Republic of the Congo) Kinshasa	13.21	(Argentina) Buenos Aires	13.02	(United Kingdom) London	12.37
30	(Democratic Republic of the Congo) Kinshasa	10.94	(Tanzania) Dar es Salaam	13.16	(Peru) Lima	12.68	(Egypt) Luxor	12.30

== See also ==
- Future generations
- Population ageing
- Population projection
- Population growth
- Estimates of historical world population
- Human overpopulation
- Human population planning
- Immunocontraception
- Population Matters (UK-based charity)
- List of countries by total fertility rate
- List of countries by number of births
- World Population Prospects
