= Claudia Tebaldi =

Italian-American statistician and climate change researcher

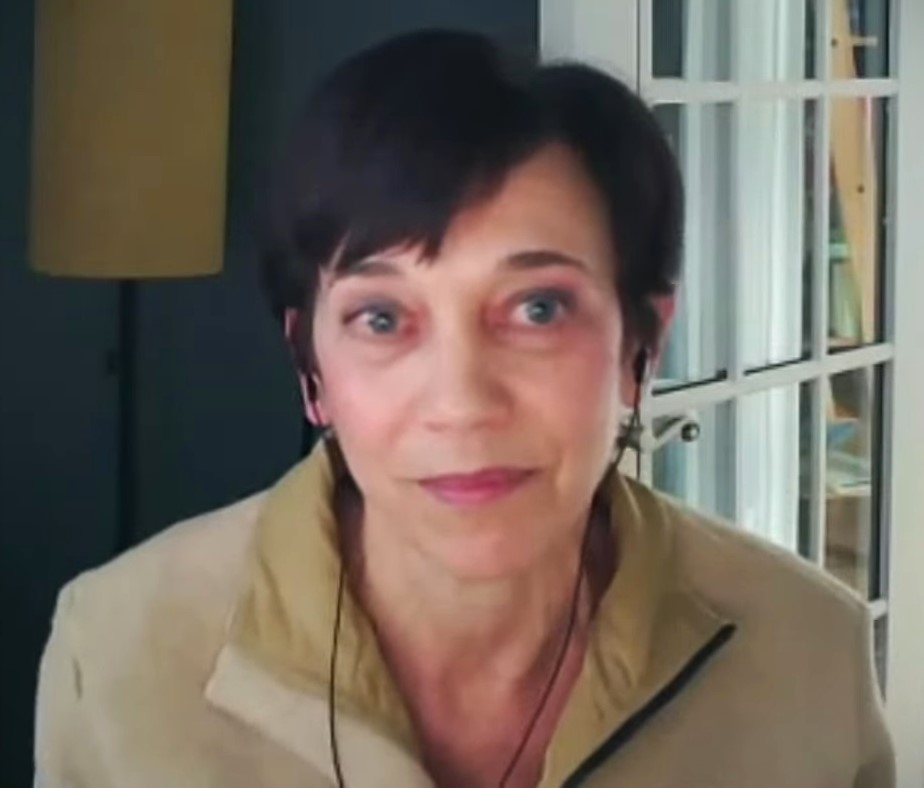
- Tebaldi in 2024
- Education: Duke University; Università Bocconi
- Scientific career
- Workplaces: Joint Global Change Research Institute
- Thesis: Bayesian analysis of network flow problems (1997)

Claudia Tebaldi is an Italian American statistician who is a climate change researcher at the Joint Global Change Research Institute. Her research evaluates extreme climate events. With her mentor, Jerry Meehl, at the National Center for Atmospheric Research (NCAR), she published one of the first papers looking at changes in extremes because of human-made warming. The paper, from 2004, predicted that global warming would bring more intense, frequent and longer lasting heat waves. She was elected a Fellow of the American Geophysical Union in 2023.

== Early life and education ==
Tebaldi grew up in Italy. She studied economics at the Università Bocconi and completed her doctoral studies in statistics at Duke University. Her doctorate involved a Bayesian analysis of network flow problems. She was interested in her applying her statistics to a real world problem, and she moved to the National Center for Atmospheric Research as a postdoctoral fellow in the Geophysical Statistics Project. Her early work studied clean-air turbulence for aviation safety.

== Research and career ==
Tebaldi uses statistical analysis to better understand climate change. She is a researcher in the Pacific Northwest National Laboratory – University of Maryland Joint Global Change Research Institute. In the last years, her research considers impacts of climate change on the human system, including economy, agriculture, water resources.

Tebaldi modelled the impact of sea level rise on storm surges along the coasts of the United States. Her research predicted substantial changes in the frequency of extreme water levels, even in areas with low sea level rise. She went on to study extreme sea levels in various climate scenarios (global warming from 1.5 to 5 °C), and found that extreme sea levels would become more common all around the world.

Tebaldi was a lead author for two of the latest reports of the international body for the Intergovernmental Panel on Climate Change.

== Selected publications ==
- Claudia Tebaldi; Reto Knutti (1 August 2007). "The use of the multi-model ensemble in probabilistic climate projections". Philosophical Transactions of the Royal Society A. 365 (1857): 2053–2075. doi:10.1098/rsta.2007.2076. ISSN 1364-503X. PMID 17569654. Wikidata Q40203597.
- Gerald A Meehl; Claudia Tebaldi (1 August 2004). "More intense, more frequent, and longer lasting heat waves in the 21st century". Science. 305 (5686): 994–997. doi:10.1126/science.1098704. ISSN 0036-8075. PMID 15310900. Wikidata Q34341130.
- David B Lobell; Marshall B Burke; Claudia Tebaldi; Michael D Mastrandrea; Walter P Falcon; Rosamond L Naylor (1 February 2008). "Prioritizing climate change adaptation needs for food security in 2030". Science. 319 (5863): 607–610. doi:10.1126/science.1152339. ISSN 0036-8075. PMID 18239122. Wikidata Q31145010.
