= Brian C. O'Neill =

American earth system scientist

- Born: 1965 (age 59–60)
- Citizenship: United States
- Education: Ph.D. in Earth Systems Science; M.S. in Applied Science
- Alma mater: New York University
- Known for: Scenario analysis Population and climate change
- Scientific career
- Fields: Earth system science Demography integrated assessment modeling
- Institutions: IIASA; Brown University; NCAR
- Website: www.pnnl.gov/atmospheric/staff/staff_info.asp?staff_num=10338

Brian C. O'Neill (born 1965) is an American earth system scientist who studies the relationship between future societal development, emissions, and climate change impacts. O'Neill is known for interdisciplinary work on climate and human systems, in particular population and climate change. He was also involved in the development of the shared socioeconomic pathways (SSPs) to be used in scenario analysis. He served as a lead author for several Intergovernmental Panel on Climate Change reports.

== Education ==
O'Neill obtained an M.S. in Applied Science and a Ph.D. in Earth Systems Science from New York University and his undergraduate degree from the University of Delaware.

== Career ==
After working on the science staff of the Environmental Defense Fund in New York, he was an Assistant and Associate Professor (Research) at Brown University's Watson Institute for International Studies. From 2005 to 2009 O'Neill was at the International Institute for Applied Systems Analysis (IIASA) in Austria, where he founded and led the Population and Climate Change Program. Afterwards, he returned to the United States to work at the National Center for Atmospheric Research (NCAR). At NCAR, he was a Senior Scientist and led the Integrated Assessment Modeling (IAM) group. In September 2018, he started working as a professor for the Josef Korbel School of International Studies at the University of Denver. In October 2020, O'Neill was appointed as director of the Joint Global Change Research Institute of the University of Maryland, College Park and the Pacific Northwest National Laboratory.

== Research ==
O'Neill has researched the interplay of future societal development, emissions, and climate change impacts. He has written several publications on the relationship between demography and climate change, including how demographic factors like aging or urbanization affect emission trajectories and how climate change impacts are dependent on demographic composition, which affects the ability to adapt.

O'Neill uses long-term scenarios in his analysis and contributes to their development. Most notably, he was involved in the development of the Shared Socioeconomic Pathways (SSPs) to be used in scenario analysis. These SSPs replace the Special Report on Emissions Scenarios (SRES) projections and will be used to systematically assess climate change under different societal futures. O'Neill was also the driving force behind the first Scenarios Forum in 2019, which he organized at the University of Denver.

O'Neill has performed research on impacts from climate change by using integrated assessment modelling impacts, as well as advancing concepts on how to best systematically assess impacts. He co-led the "Benefits of Reduced Anthropogenic Climate changE" (BRACE) project to study climate change impacts and co-edited a special issue in Climatic Change.

O'Neill has also served as a lead author for the Intergovernmental Panel on Climate Change's Assessment Reports. For the volumes on impacts, adaptation and vulnerability (Working Group II), he was lead author for the chapter on "New Assessment Methods and the Characterisation of Future Conditions" (AR4) and "Emergent Risks and Key Vulnerabilities" (AR5), respectively. O'Neill is currently coordinating lead author of the Sixth Assessment Report for the chapter on "Key risks across sectors and regions".

== Personal life ==
O'Neill has been married to Celeste O'Neill for 25 years and is the father of two girls.

== Major publications ==
- O'Neill, Brian C; MacKellar, F Landis; Lutz, Wolfgang (2001). Population and Climate Change. Cambridge University Press.
- Dalton, Michael; O'Neill, Brian; Prskawetz, Alexia; Jiang, Leiwen; Pitkin, John (2008). "Population aging and future carbon emissions in the United States" (PDF). Energy Economics. 30 (2): 642–675. doi:10.1016/j.eneco.2006.07.002.
- O'Neill, Brian C; Dalton, Michael; Fuchs, Regina; Jiang, Leiwen; Pachauri, Shonali; Zigova, Katarina (2010). "Global demographic trends and future carbon emissions" (PDF). Proceedings of the National Academy of Sciences. 107 (41): 17521–17526. Bibcode:2010PNAS..10717521O. doi:10.1073/pnas.1004581107. PMC 2955139. PMID 20937861.
- Kriegler, Elmar; O'Neill, Brian C; Hallegatte, Stephane; Kram, Tom; Lempert, Robert J; Moss, Richard H; Wilbanks, Thomas (2012). "The need for and use of socio-economic scenarios for climate change analysis: A new approach based on shared socio-economic pathways". Global Environmental Change. 22 (4): 807–822. doi:10.1016/j.gloenvcha.2012.05.005.
- O'Neill, Brian C; Liddle, Brant; Jiang, Leiwen; Smith, Kirk R; Pachauri, Shonali; Dalton, Michael; Fuchs, Regina (2012). "Demographic change and carbon dioxide emissions". The Lancet. 380 (9837): 157–164. doi:10.1016/S0140-6736(12)60958-1. PMID 22784534. S2CID 41807250.
- O'Neill, Brian C; Kriegler, Elmar; Riahi, Keywan; Ebi, Kristie L; Hallegatte, Stephane; Carter, Timothy R; Mathur, Ritu; Van Vuuren, Detlef P (2013). "A new scenario framework for climate change research: The concept of shared socioeconomic pathways". Climatic Change. 122 (3): 387–400. doi:10.1007/s10584-013-0905-2. hdl:10986/23213.
- O'Neill, Brian C; Kriegler, Elmar; Ebi, Kristie L; Kemp-Benedict, Eric; Riahi, Keywan; Rothman, Dale S; Van Ruijven, Bas J; Van Vuuren, Detlef P; Birkmann, Joern; Kok, Kasper; Levy, Marc; Solecki, William (2017). "The roads ahead: Narratives for shared socioeconomic pathways describing world futures in the 21st century". Global Environmental Change. 42: 169–180. doi:10.1016/j.gloenvcha.2015.01.004. hdl:1874/347567.
- O'Neill, Brian C; Oppenheimer, Michael; Warren, Rachel; Hallegatte, Stephane; Kopp, Robert E; Pörtner, Hans O; Scholes, Robert; Birkmann, Joern; Foden, Wendy; Licker, Rachel; Mach, Katharine J; Marbaix, Phillippe; Mastrandrea, Michael D; Price, Jeff; Takahashi, Kiyoshi; Van Ypersele, Jean-Pascal; Yohe, Gary (2017). "IPCC reasons for concern regarding climate change risks" (PDF). Nature Climate Change. 7 (1): 28–37. Bibcode:2017NatCC...7...28O. doi:10.1038/nclimate3179.
- O'Neill, Brian C; Done, James; Gettelman, Andrew; Lawrence, Peter; Lehner, Flavio; Lamarque, Jean-Francois; Lin, Lei; Monaghan, Andrew; Oleson, Keith; Ren, Xiaolin; Sanderson, Benjamin; Tebaldi, Claudia; Weitzel, Matthias; Xu, Yangyang; Anderson, Brooke; Fix, Miranda J; Levis, Samuel (2017). "The Benefits of Reduced Anthropogenic Climate changE (BRACE): A synthesis". Climatic Change. 146 (3–4): 287–301. doi:10.1007/s10584-017-2009-x. S2CID 157109251.
