= Wolfgang Lutz =

Austrian demographer

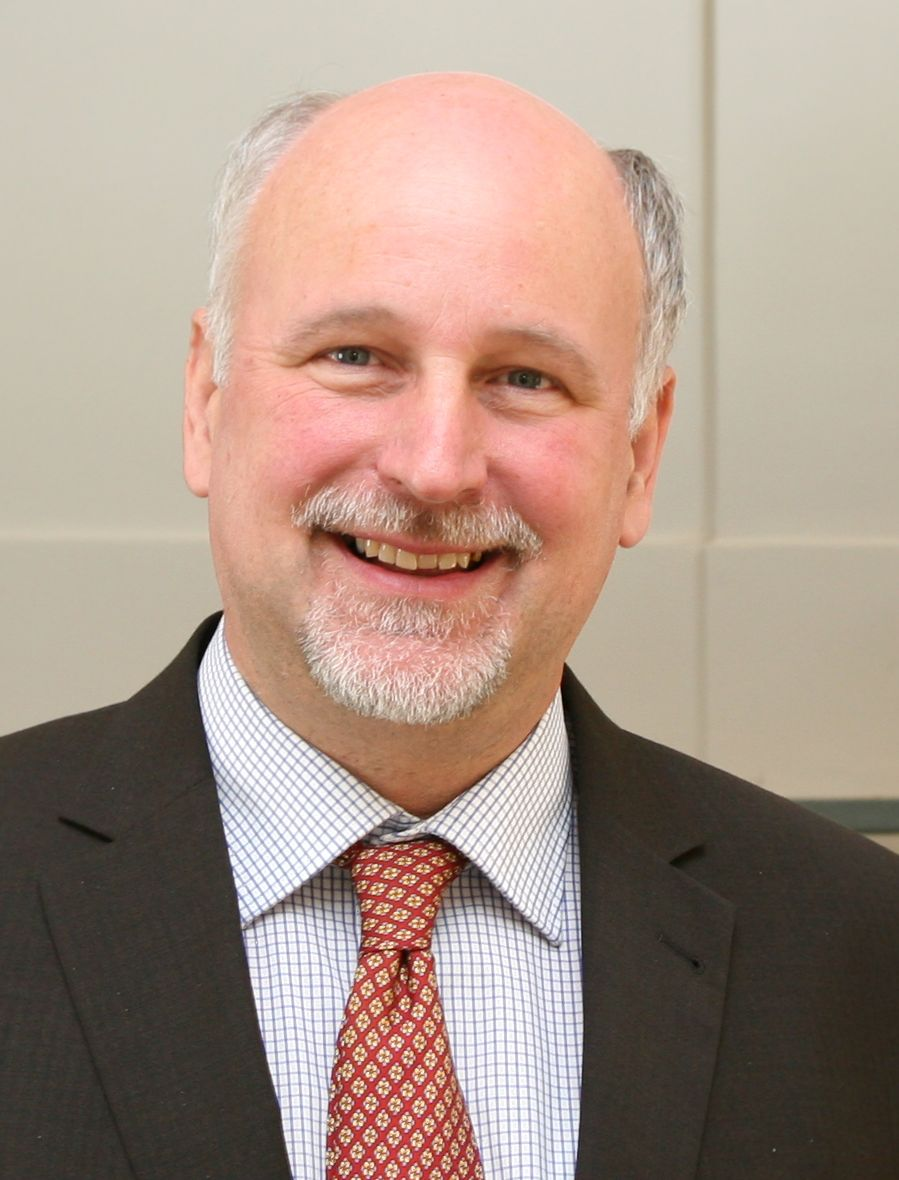
- Born: 10 December 1956 (age 69)
- Citizenship: Austrian
- Education: University of Pennsylvania (1982, 1983); University of Vienna (1988)
- Scientific career
- Fields: Demographic analysis Population projection Family demography Population-Environment Interaction
- Workplaces: International Institute for Applied Systems Analysis; Vienna Institute of Demography; Wittgenstein Centre for Demography and Global Human Capital

Wolfgang Lutz (born 10 December 1956) is an Austrian demographer specializing in demographic analysis, population projections, as well as population and sustainable development. He is the current Interim Deputy Director General for Science of the International Institute for Applied Systems Analysis (IIASA), as well as the Founding Director of the Wittgenstein Centre for Demography and Global Human Capital – a collaboration between IIASA, the Vienna Institute of Demography (VID) of the Austrian Academy of Sciences, and the University of Vienna. In the latter, he also established the new Department of Demography.

In October 1985 he joined IIASA to lead the institute’s former World Population Program. He has been director of VID since 2002 as well as a full professor of demography (part-time) at the University of Vienna. He is also adjunct professor at Shanghai University, where he chairs the international scientific advisory board of the Asian Demographic Research Institute (ADRI).

== Biography ==
Wolfgang Lutz was born in Rome and went to school in Munich, Saarbrücken, and Vienna. He holds a Ph.D. in demography from the University of Pennsylvania (1983) and a Habilitation (second doctorate) in statistics from the University of Vienna. He also received an Honorary Doctorate from the Chulalongkorn University in Bangkok.

Lutz has worked on family demography, fertility analysis, and population projection as well as the interaction between population and the environment. He is a leading academic in the field of population and sustainable development and was one of the scientists appointed by the UN to write the Global Sustainable Development Report 2019. He also serves as special advisor to the Vice-President of the European Commission, Dubravka Šuica.

He has authored a series of world population projections produced at IIASA and developed approaches for projecting education and human capital. Lutz is also the principal investigator of the Asian Meta Centre for Population and Sustainable Development Analysis and a professorial affiliate research fellow at the Oxford Institute of Population Ageing. He is the author and editor of 28 books and more than 290 refereed articles, including 24 in Science and Nature, and Proceedings of the National Academy of Sciences (PNAS). In 2009, and again in 2016, he received a European Research Council (ERC) Advanced Grant, in 2009 the Mattei Dogan Award of the International Union for the Scientific Study of Population (IUSSP), in 2010 the Wittgenstein Award, (often referred to as "Austria's Nobel Prize"), in 2016 the Mindel C. Sheps Award of the Population Association of America, and in 2023 the Science Prize of the Austrian Research Association.

He is a member of the Austrian Academy of Sciences, the German National Academy Leopoldina, the US National Academy of Sciences (NAS), the World Academy of Sciences (TWAS), the Finnish Society for Sciences and Letters, and the Academia Europaea.

In 2021 he published “Advanced Introduction to Demography” in which he summarizes the foundations and applications of multi-dimensional demography – a field pioneered by Lutz – which captures population dynamics not only by the conventional age and sex structures, but also by other demographic dimensions such as educational attainment and labor force participation.

In 2024 he received the Yidan Prize for Education Research.

== Selected publications ==
- Lutz, Wolfgang, ed. (1994). Population-Development-Environment. Understanding Their Interactions in Mauritius. Heidelberg: Springer Press.
- Lutz, Wolfgang, ed. (1996). The Future Population of the World. What Can We Assume Today?. London: Earthscan.
- Lutz, W.; Sanderson, S.; Scherbov, S. (1997). "Doubling of world population unlikely" (PDF). Nature. 387 (6635): 803–805. Bibcode:1997Natur.387..803L. doi:10.1038/42935. PMID 9194559. S2CID 4306159.
- O'Neill, B. J.; MacKellar, F. L.; Lutz, W. (2001). Population and Climate Change. Cambridge University.
- Lutz, W.; Sanderson, S.; Scherbov, S. (2001). "The end of world population growth" (PDF). Nature. 412 (6846): 543–545. Bibcode:2001Natur.412..543L. doi:10.1038/35087589. PMID 11484054. S2CID 4425080.
- Lutz, W.; O'Neill, B. C.; Scherbov, S. (2003). "Europe's population at a turning point" (PDF). Science. 299 (5615): 1991–1992. doi:10.1126/science.1080316. PMID 12663901. S2CID 1700.
- Lutz, Wolfgang; Sanderson, Warren; Scherbov, Sergei, eds. (2004). The End of World Population Growth in the 21st Century: New Challenges for Human Capital Formation and Sustainable Development. London: Earthscan.
- Lutz, W.; Kritzinger, S.; Skirbekk, V. (2006). "The demography of growing European identity". Science. 314 (5798): 425. doi:10.1126/science.1128313. PMID 17053133. S2CID 152853957.
- Lutz, W.; Scherbov, S. (2008). "The coming acceleration of global population ageing". Nature. 451 (7179): 716–719. Bibcode:2008Natur.451..716L. doi:10.1038/nature06516. PMID 18204438. S2CID 4379499.
- Lutz, W.; Cuaresma, C.; Sanderson, W. (2008). "The demography of educational attainment and economic growth". Science. 319 (5866): 1047–1048. doi:10.1126/science.1151753. PMID 18292326. S2CID 206509878.
- Lutz, W. (2009). "Sola schola et sanitate: Human capital as the root cause and priority for international development?". Philosophical Transactions of the Royal Society B: Biological Sciences. 364 (1532): 3031–3047. doi:10.1098/rstb.2009.0156. PMC 2781833. PMID 19770154.
- Lutz, W.; KC, S. (2010). "Dimensions of global population projections: What do we know about future population trends and structures?". Philosophical Transactions of the Royal Society B: Biological Sciences. 365 (1554): 2779–2791. doi:10.1098/rstb.2010.0133. PMC 2935115. PMID 20713384.
- Lutz, W.; Cuaresma, C.; Abbasi-Shavazi, M. J. (2010). "Demography, education, and democracy: Global trends and the case of Iran" (PDF). Population and Development Review. 36 (2): 253–281. doi:10.1111/j.1728-4457.2010.00329.x. PMID 20734552.
- Lutz, W.; KC, S. (2011). "Global human capital: Integration education and population". Science. 333 (6042): 587–592. Bibcode:2011Sci...333..587L. doi:10.1126/science.1206964. PMID 21798940. S2CID 206534530.
- Scherbov, S.; Lutz, W.; Sanderson, W. C. (2011). "The uncertain timing of reaching 8 billion, peak world population, and other demographic milestones". Population and Development Review. 37 (3): 571–578. doi:10.1111/j.1728-4457.2011.00435.x. PMID 22167816.
- Pamuk, E. R.; Fuchs, R.; Lutz, W. (2011). "Comparing relative effects of education and economic resources on infant mortality in developing countries". Population and Development Review. 37 (4): 637–664. doi:10.1111/j.1728-4457.2011.00451.x. PMID 22319768.
- Lutz, W. (2013). "Demographic metabolism: A predictive theory of socioeconomic change". Population and Development Review. 38: 283–301. CiteSeerX 10.1.1.278.4036. doi:10.1111/j.1728-4457.2013.00564.x.
- Lutz, W.; Muttarak, R.; Striessnig, W. (2014). "Universal education is key to enhanced climate adaptation". Science. 346 (6213): 1061–1062. Bibcode:2014Sci...346.1061L. doi:10.1126/science.1257975. PMID 25430758. S2CID 7481931.
