= 1981 census of India =

- 9 to 28 February 1981

General information
- Country: India

Results
- Total population: 685,184,692 (25.04%)
- Most populous region: Uttar Pradesh (105,113,300)
- Least populous region: Sikkim (316,840)

The 1981 census of India was the 12th in a series of censuses held in India every decade since 1871. The population of India was counted as 685,184,692 people.

== Population by state ==
Population of Indian states and union territories in 1981
State/Union Territory	Population
Andhra Pradesh	53,549,673
Assam (Note: projected figure for 1981)	19,896,843
Bihar	69,914,734
Gujarat	34,085,799
Haryana	12,922,618
Himachal Pradesh	4,280,818
Jammu and Kashmir	5,987,389
Karnataka	37,135,714
Kerala	25,453,680
Madhya Pradesh	52,178,844
Maharashtra	62,784,171
Manipur	1,420,953
Meghalaya	1,335,819
Nagaland	774,930
Orissa	26,370,271
Punjab	16,788,915
Rajasthan	34,261,862
Sikkim	316,385
Tamil Nadu	48,408,077
Tripura	2,053,058
Uttar Pradesh	110,862,013
West Bengal	54,580,647
Andaman and Nicobar Islands (UT)	188,741
Arunachal Pradesh (UT)	631,839
Chandigarh (UT)	451,610
Dadra and Nagar Haveli (UT)	103,676
Delhi (NCT)	6,220,406
Goa, Daman and Diu (UT)	1,086,730
Lakshadweep (UT)	40,249
Mizoram (UT)	493,757
Pondicherry (UT)	604,471

== Religious demographics ==
Major religious groups in India in 1981
1. Hinduism (82.4%)
2. Islam (11.3%)
3. Christianity (2.43%)
4. Sikhism (1.97%)
5. Buddhism (0.71%)
6. Others (0.42%)
7. Not stated (0.01%)

== See also ==
- Demographics of India
