= List of countries by number of deaths =

The following list sorts sovereign states and dependent territories and by the total number of deaths. Figures are from the 2024 revision of the United Nations World Population Prospects report, for the calendar year 2026, a total of 63,637,293 deaths.

== List of countries by number of deaths ==
Countries and dependent territories by the number of deaths in 2026 according to the World Population Prospects 2024 of the United Nations Department of Economic and Social Affairs.

Country	Number of deaths (2026)
China	11,482,043
India	9,888,274
United States	3,136,202
Nigeria	2,780,783
Indonesia	2,247,438
Russia	1,868,418
Pakistan	1,664,087
Brazil	1,566,186
Japan	1,563,215
Germany	1,042,378
Democratic Republic of the Congo	958,937
Bangladesh	913,453
Mexico	844,430
Ethiopia	795,185
Philippines	775,845
Vietnam	695,501
United Kingdom	677,695
Egypt	672,443
Italy	669,403
Thailand	661,907
France	631,107
South Africa	609,623
Turkey	565,453
Ukraine	527,216
Myanmar	513,957
Iran	460,929
Spain	460,482
Poland	419,456
Kenya	417,824
Tanzania	405,955
South Korea	385,355
Argentina	361,468
Canada	331,403
Sudan	330,515
Colombia	304,666
Angola	268,922
North Korea	267,788
Romania	255,931
Côte d'Ivoire	251,629
Ghana	248,774
Afghanistan	248,524
Mozambique	246,990
Madagascar	246,621
Uganda	245,640
Niger	243,202
Chad	235,921
Morocco	229,022
Uzbekistan	228,605
Venezuela	226,499
Algeria	224,898
Mali	213,845
Taiwan	208,866
Cameroon	208,554
Nepal	207,364
Iraq	203,068
Peru	200,302
Yemen	198,677
Malaysia	198,321
Somalia	193,980
Burkina Faso	191,224
Australia	187,033
Netherlands	171,311
Sri Lanka	169,566
Kazakhstan	143,331
Guinea	136,486
Chile	134,953
Benin	129,783
Hungary	128,367
Zimbabwe	125,985
Syria	125,882
Greece	124,937
South Sudan	123,090
Belarus	119,042
Portugal	118,973
Cambodia	118,566
Malawi	118,129
Czech Republic	117,684
Belgium	115,904
Cuba	115,769
Zambia	114,941
Senegal	104,057
Bulgaria	102,232
Ecuador	98,155
Sweden	97,652
Burundi	96,877
Serbia	95,299
Haiti	94,315
Austria	93,674
Guatemala	93,484
Bolivia	91,521
Rwanda	86,679
Saudi Arabia	81,748
Tunisia	78,286
Switzerland	76,989
Togo	75,184
Dominican Republic	74,579
Papua New Guinea	72,657
Sierra Leone	72,457
Azerbaijan	71,738
Finland	61,221
Hong Kong	59,151
Denmark	59,118
Slovakia	57,002
Israel	53,826
Croatia	53,431
Central African Republic	52,068
Honduras	51,442
Tajikistan	50,919
Laos	49,165
El Salvador	48,100
Liberia	46,361
Turkmenistan	45,980
Kyrgyzstan	45,069
Georgia	44,971
Norway	44,359
Bosnia and Herzegovina	42,697
Moldova	42,144
Paraguay	41,123
Republic of the Congo	40,986
New Zealand	39,926
Lithuania	39,704
Ireland	37,687
Jordan	37,665
Libya	37,073
Lebanon	36,463
Puerto Rico	35,223
Uruguay	33,731
Nicaragua	33,653
Singapore	30,818
Costa Rica	29,901
Mauritania	28,554
Armenia	27,831
Latvia	27,245
Lesotho	24,271
Albania	24,242
Jamaica	24,086
Panama	23,224
Slovenia	22,306
Eritrea	21,702
Mongolia	21,265
North Macedonia	20,314
Namibia	19,540
Gambia	17,812
Estonia	16,502
Palestine	16,412
Gabon	16,276
Guinea-Bissau	15,957
Equatorial Guinea	15,386
Botswana	14,981
Trinidad and Tobago	13,879
Mauritius	11,933
United Arab Emirates	11,114
Oman	10,553
Kosovo	10,430
Timor-Leste	10,203
Eswatini	9,887
Cyprus	9,787
Kuwait	9,190
Djibouti	9,028
Fiji	8,963
Montenegro	7,273
Guyana	6,416
Comoros	6,240
Réunion	5,270
Luxembourg	5,061
Bhutan	4,827
Suriname	4,505
Malta	4,337
Solomon Islands	4,297
Western Sahara	4,030
Guadeloupe	3,765
Bahrain	3,741
Martinique	3,690
Bahamas	3,639
Macao	3,593
Qatar	3,270
Barbados	2,937
Cape Verde	2,759
Iceland	2,683
Brunei	2,614
Belize	2,175
Curaçao	1,926
New Caledonia	1,899
Vanuatu	1,689
Saint Lucia	1,611
French Guiana	1,545
Samoa	1,368
São Tomé and Príncipe	1,335
Maldives	1,308
United States Virgin Islands	1,291
Guam	1,212
French Polynesia	1,174
Saint Vincent and the Grenadines	1,153
Jersey	1,137
Aruba	1,108
Seychelles	1,092
Grenada	1,058
Kiribati	981
Mayotte	919
Isle of Man	919
Micronesia	898
Dominica	815
Monaco	714
Antigua and Barbuda	685
Tonga	671
Guernsey	620
Bermuda	602
Greenland	589
Faroe Islands	543
Andorra	530
Saint Kitts and Nevis	473
Cayman Islands	386
Sint Maarten	386
Turks and Caicos Islands	351
American Samoa	350
Liechtenstein	329
San Marino	291
Gibraltar	275
Bonaire, Sint Eustatius and Saba	274
Marshall Islands	263
British Virgin Islands	251
Saint Martin	248
Northern Mariana Islands	238
Palau	215
Cook Islands	133
Anguilla	103
Wallis and Futuna	94
Nauru	93
Saint Helena	89
Tuvalu	88
Saint Pierre and Miquelon	79
Saint Barthélemy	77
Montserrat	59
Falkland Islands	28
Niue	27
Tokelau	15

== See also ==
- List of countries by mortality rate
- List of countries by life expectancy
- List of countries by number of births
