= Alexia Fürnkranz-Prskawetz =

Austrian demographer and economist

Alexia Fürnkranz-Prskawetz (born 1966; published as Alexia Prskawetz) is an Austrian demographer and economist, the former director of the Vienna Institute of Demography and a director of the Wittgenstein Centre for Demography and Global Human Capital. She continues at the Vienna Institute of Demography as its deputy director, and also holds a professorship in mathematical economics at the Institute of Statistics and Mathematical Methods in Economics of TU Wien. Her research applies control theory and nonlinear dynamics to population economics, including the effects of fertility, education policy, migration, and population ageing on the workforce.

== Education and career ==
Fürnkranz-Prskawetz was born in 1966 in Vienna. She was a student of technical mathematics applied to economics at TU Wien, earning an engineering diploma there in 1989, and completing a doctorate (Dr. techn.) in 1992. Her doctoral research also included a stint as a Fulbright Scholar at the University of Chicago.

She became a research assistant at the Vienna Institute of Demography and at the Institute for Econometrics, Operations Research and Systems Theory of TU Wien, earning a habilitation through TU Wien in 1998. This period also included postdoctoral study at the University of California, Berkeley Department of Demography from 1997 to 1998.

After heading a research group at the Max Planck Institute for Demographic Research in Rostock, Germany, from 1998 to 2003, she returned to the Vienna Institute of Demography as deputy director in 2003. In 2008 she added a second affiliation as professor of mathematical economics at TU Wien, and in 2011 she became a director of the Wittgenstein Centre for Demography and Global Human Capital. From 2012 to 2014 she headed TU Wien's Institute of Mathematical Methods in Economics, and from 2015 to 2016 she headed its Institute of Statistics and Mathematical Methods in Economics. She was director of the Vienna Institute of Demography from 2016 to 2019, and interim director again in 2013, returning to deputy director afterwards.

== Recognition ==
Fürnkranz-Prskawetz was the 2003 recipient of the Gustav Figdor Award for Law, Social Sciences and Economics of the Austrian Academy of Sciences.

She became a corresponding member of the Austrian Academy of Sciences in 2007, and a full member in 2011. She was elected to the German National Academy of Sciences Leopoldina in 2015, and to the Academia Europaea in 2022.
