= List of countries by number of births =

Countries by the estimated number of births, 2024

The following list sorts sovereign states and dependent territories and by the total number of births. Figures are from the 2024 revision of the United Nations World Population Prospects report, for the calendar year 2026, a total of 132,503,451 births.

== List ==
Number of births by country (2026)
1. India (17.4%)
2. China (6.00%)
3. Nigeria (5.80%)
4. Pakistan (5.21%)
5. Indonesia (3.39%)
6. Democratic Republic of the Congo (3.30%)
7. Ethiopia (3.11%)
8. United States (2.77%)
9. Bangladesh (2.64%)
10. Brazil (1.97%)
11. Egypt (1.82%)
12. Others (45.8%)

Countries and dependent territories by the number of births in 2026 according to the World Population Prospects 2024 of the United Nations Department of Economic and Social Affairs.

| Country | Number of births (2026) |
|---|---|
| India | 22,988,461 |
| China | 8,625,232 |
| Nigeria | 7,711,752 |
| Pakistan | 6,935,665 |
| Democratic Republic of the Congo | 4,634,979 |
| Indonesia | 4,419,970 |
| Ethiopia | 4,213,081 |
| United States | 3,673,260 |
| Bangladesh | 3,407,860 |
| Brazil | 2,492,914 |
| Tanzania | 2,459,538 |
| Egypt | 2,459,317 |
| Mexico | 1,989,217 |
| Philippines | 1,853,794 |
| Uganda | 1,746,979 |
| Sudan | 1,694,024 |
| Kenya | 1,558,303 |
| Afghanistan | 1,520,756 |
| Angola | 1,461,075 |
| Yemen | 1,406,796 |
| Mozambique | 1,323,752 |
| Vietnam | 1,307,471 |
| Russia | 1,213,374 |
| Iraq | 1,200,201 |
| South Africa | 1,167,803 |
| Niger | 1,157,021 |
| Iran | 1,101,751 |
| Turkey | 1,045,681 |
| Madagascar | 1,033,723 |
| Côte d'Ivoire | 1,028,953 |
| Mali | 1,005,407 |
| Cameroon | 991,664 |
| Chad | 909,765 |
| Ghana | 903,735 |
| Uzbekistan | 894,379 |
| Myanmar | 881,077 |
| Somalia | 836,420 |
| Algeria | 832,197 |
| Burkina Faso | 747,913 |
| Japan | 745,943 |
| Zambia | 721,060 |
| Malawi | 692,256 |
| Germany | 689,997 |
| Colombia | 684,798 |
| United Kingdom | 678,001 |
| France | 633,972 |
| Syria | 625,121 |
| Morocco | 613,838 |
| Saudi Arabia | 567,889 |
| Thailand | 566,113 |
| Senegal | 554,508 |
| Nepal | 542,047 |
| Peru | 532,846 |
| Argentina | 510,178 |
| Zimbabwe | 505,305 |
| Guinea | 497,357 |
| Benin | 494,197 |
| Burundi | 471,624 |
| Malaysia | 440,401 |
| Venezuela | 439,529 |
| Rwanda | 409,278 |
| Kazakhstan | 390,247 |
| Guatemala | 380,396 |
| Italy | 379,621 |
| South Sudan | 365,962 |
| Canada | 361,315 |
| Cambodia | 352,442 |
| North Korea | 328,497 |
| Spain | 327,412 |
| Sri Lanka | 316,459 |
| Australia | 303,345 |
| Togo | 299,393 |
| Poland | 283,495 |
| Ecuador | 267,031 |
| Tajikistan | 261,679 |
| Bolivia | 261,496 |
| Sierra Leone | 261,328 |
| Papua New Guinea | 257,492 |
| Haiti | 256,749 |
| Central African Republic | 254,783 |
| South Korea | 249,556 |
| Ukraine | 242,008 |
| Honduras | 234,199 |
| Jordan | 222,912 |
| Republic of the Congo | 198,689 |
| Dominican Republic | 196,929 |
| Mauritania | 181,311 |
| Romania | 176,198 |
| Netherlands | 176,063 |
| Liberia | 174,971 |
| Israel | 171,923 |
| Chile | 169,096 |
| Laos | 160,077 |
| Tunisia | 156,979 |
| Kyrgyzstan | 148,668 |
| Turkmenistan | 148,664 |
| Palestine | 144,467 |
| Paraguay | 134,692 |
| Nicaragua | 131,205 |
| Taiwan | 122,589 |
| Azerbaijan | 119,620 |
| United Arab Emirates | 119,325 |
| Libya | 118,954 |
| Eritrea | 105,398 |
| Belgium | 100,860 |
| El Salvador | 96,922 |
| Sweden | 96,301 |
| Lebanon | 92,671 |
| Cuba | 92,314 |
| Oman | 90,828 |
| Portugal | 85,260 |
| Czech Republic | 83,205 |
| Hungary | 83,010 |
| Gambia | 82,634 |
| Switzerland | 80,644 |
| Namibia | 78,927 |
| Austria | 74,449 |
| Panama | 71,573 |
| Gabon | 69,484 |
| Greece | 67,361 |
| Guinea-Bissau | 66,031 |
| Belarus | 61,280 |
| Botswana | 60,884 |
| Mongolia | 60,067 |
| Denmark | 59,616 |
| Bulgaria | 59,343 |
| New Zealand | 57,999 |
| Equatorial Guinea | 57,895 |
| Serbia | 57,151 |
| Lesotho | 55,312 |
| Norway | 53,084 |
| Ireland | 52,626 |
| Singapore | 50,564 |
| Costa Rica | 50,203 |
| Kuwait | 49,465 |
| Slovakia | 47,925 |
| Finland | 43,863 |
| Georgia | 41,353 |
| Hong Kong | 38,112 |
| Armenia | 33,694 |
| Uruguay | 32,873 |
| Jamaica | 31,322 |
| Qatar | 30,830 |
| Timor-Leste | 30,774 |
| Croatia | 30,609 |
| Moldova | 29,962 |
| Eswatini | 29,062 |
| Albania | 26,604 |
| Comoros | 24,599 |
| Djibouti | 24,494 |
| Bosnia and Herzegovina | 24,034 |
| Solomon Islands | 22,440 |
| Lithuania | 21,457 |
| Bahrain | 19,865 |
| Kosovo | 19,260 |
| Puerto Rico | 19,121 |
| Slovenia | 16,897 |
| Fiji | 16,340 |
| Guyana | 16,120 |
| North Macedonia | 16,027 |
| Trinidad and Tobago | 15,251 |
| Cyprus | 13,687 |
| Latvia | 13,328 |
| Mayotte | 11,466 |
| Réunion | 11,325 |
| Mauritius | 11,254 |
| Suriname | 10,815 |
| Estonia | 10,156 |
| Bhutan | 9,783 |
| Vanuatu | 9,193 |
| Western Sahara | 9,008 |
| French Guiana | 7,560 |
| Belize | 7,471 |
| Luxembourg | 6,943 |
| São Tomé and Príncipe | 6,777 |
| Montenegro | 6,694 |
| Cape Verde | 6,330 |
| Brunei | 5,974 |
| Samoa | 5,373 |
| Maldives | 5,224 |
| Macao | 4,437 |
| Iceland | 4,346 |
| Bahamas | 4,268 |
| Malta | 4,222 |
| New Caledonia | 4,038 |
| Guadeloupe | 3,854 |
| Kiribati | 3,370 |
| Martinique | 3,248 |
| Barbados | 3,107 |
| French Polynesia | 2,916 |
| Guam | 2,851 |
| Micronesia | 2,509 |
| Tonga | 2,339 |
| Saint Lucia | 1,959 |
| Seychelles | 1,786 |
| Curaçao | 1,400 |
| Grenada | 1,296 |
| Saint Vincent and the Grenadines | 1,157 |
| Antigua and Barbuda | 1,079 |
| Aruba | 1,025 |
| United States Virgin Islands | 909 |
| Jersey | 844 |
| Cayman Islands | 843 |
| Faroe Islands | 726 |
| Greenland | 714 |
| Dominica | 700 |
| Marshall Islands | 682 |
| Isle of Man | 682 |
| American Samoa | 657 |
| Andorra | 575 |
| Saint Kitts and Nevis | 528 |
| Guernsey | 524 |
| Gibraltar | 502 |
| Bermuda | 500 |
| Turks and Caicos Islands | 479 |
| Northern Mariana Islands | 468 |
| Sint Maarten | 398 |
| Liechtenstein | 370 |
| Monaco | 369 |
| British Virgin Islands | 321 |
| Bonaire, Sint Eustatius and Saba | 299 |
| Saint Martin | 287 |
| Nauru | 286 |
| San Marino | 195 |
| Tuvalu | 192 |
| Palau | 184 |
| Anguilla | 137 |
| Cook Islands | 133 |
| Wallis and Futuna | 95 |
| Saint Barthélemy | 62 |
| Tokelau | 55 |
| Saint Helena | 37 |
| Montserrat | 36 |
| Falkland Islands | 34 |
| Saint Pierre and Miquelon | 29 |
| Niue | 27 |

== See also ==
- Total fertility rate
- List of countries by total fertility rate
- List of countries by birth rate
- List of countries by number of deaths
- List of people with the most children
- List of population concern organizations
- Population growth
- Sub-replacement fertility
- Fertility and intelligence
