= David Lobell =

Environmental scientist

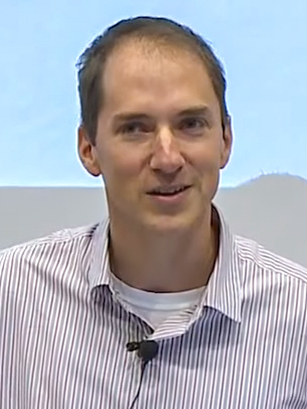
- Education: Brown University; Stanford University
- Awards: MacArthur Fellowship (2013)
- Scientific career
- Fields: Agricultural science

David B. Lobell is an agricultural ecologist. He is currently the Gloria and Richard Kushel Director of the Center on Food Security and the Environment and Professor of Earth System Science at Stanford University. He is additionally a William Wrigley Fellow at the Stanford Woods Institute for the Environment and a Senior Fellow at Stanford's Freeman Spogli Institute for International Studies. Lobell was awarded a MacArthur "Genius" Fellowship in 2013 for "unearthing richly informative, but often underutilized, sources of data to investigate the impact of climate change on crop production and global food security."

== Education ==
Lobell earned a Bachelor of Science in applied mathematics from Brown University in 2000. He received his Ph.D. in 2005 from Stanford University's Department of Geological and Environmental Sciences. From 2005 to 2008, he was a Lawrence Fellow at Lawrence Livermore National Laboratory.

== Work ==
Lobell's work deals primarily with food security. He also investigates the impact of climate change on crop yields.

== Honors and awards ==
- MacArthur Fellow, 2013
- Honorary Doctor of Science, Brown University, 2021
- NAS Prize in Food and Agriculture Sciences (2022)
