= Reto Knutti =

Swiss climate scientist and professor

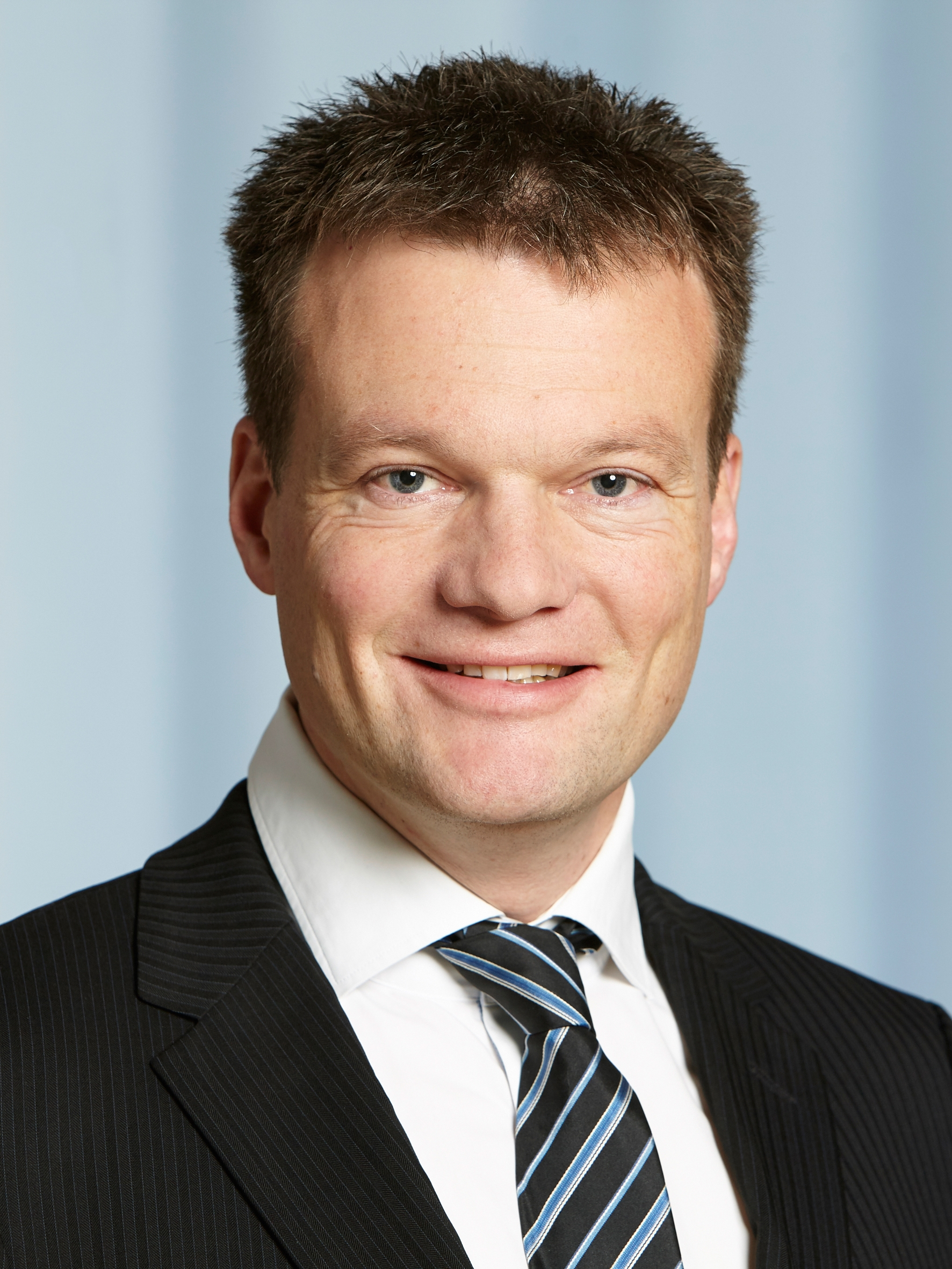
Knutti in 2017

Reto Knutti (born 1973) is a Swiss climate scientist and professor of climate physics at ETH Zurich's Institute for Atmospheric and Climate Science. He is known for his research involving climate models, and has been a key member of the Intergovernmental Panel on Climate Change.
