= Monika Schwarz-Friesel =

German cognitive scientist

Monika Schwarz-Friesel (born November 28, 1961, in Bensberg) is a German cognitive scientist, professor at Technische Universität Berlin and one of Europe's most distinguished antisemitism researchers according to Marc Neugröschel from the newspaper The Times of Israel. She is often interviewed by media outlets like Haaretz, Der Standard or Der Tagesspiegel on her research on current forms of antisemitism, which often take place on the internet.

== Education ==
Schwarz-Friesel studied German and English philology and psychology at the University of Cologne. In 1990 she received her doctorate in Cologne on the subject of "Cognitive Semantics and Neuropsychological Reality" and completed her habilitation in 1998 on the subject of "Indirect Anaphora in Texts".

== Academic career ==
Schwarz-Friesel established the approach of critical cognitive linguistics in Germany. From 2000 to 2010 she taught as a university professor for text linguistics and pragmatics at the Institute for German Linguistics at the University of Jena. Since 2010 she has held a professorship at Technische Universität Berlin.

Her research focuses on the interaction of language, cognition and emotion, cognitive semantics and metaphors, and verbal manifestations of current antisemitism.

She advises institutions on current forms of antisemitism, e.g. the platform StopAntisemitismus.de which was established in 2019 by the ZEIT-Stiftung. Also, she is the chairperson of the Board of Trustees of the Leo Trepp Foundation.

When the Simon-Wiesenthal-Prize of the Austrian Parliament was established in 2020 by the President of the National Council, Wolfgang Sobotka, she became a member of the expert jury. The Simon-Wiesenthal-Prize is awarded by the National Fund of the Republic of Austria for Victims of National Socialism for outstanding civic engagement to combat antisemitism and promote Holocaust education.

== Personal life ==
Monika Schwarz-Friesel is married to the historian Evyatar Friesel.

== Awards and honors ==
- On May 5, 2022, she gave the commemoration speech on antisemitism and culture of remembrance in the Austrian Parliament in the Vienna Hofburg.
- She received an honorary doctorate for outstanding scientific achievements from the University of Debrecen on November 29, 2014.
- Schwarz-Friesel held the Rabbi-Brandt-Lecture of the Deutscher Koordinierungsrat on November 11, 2013, on the topic “The language of antisemitism”.

== Selected publications ==
- Schwarz-Friesel, Monika (2022). Toxische Sprache und geistige Gewalt Wie judenfeindliche Denk- und Gefühlsmuster seit Jahrhunderten unsere Kommunikation prägen (in German). Narr Francke Attempto Verlag (1. Auflage ed.). Tübingen. ISBN 978-3-89308-466-1. OCLC 1292596703.
- Schwarz-Friesel, Monika (2019). Judenhass im Internet Antisemitismus als kulturelle Konstante und kollektives Gefühl (in German). Hentrich & Hentrich (1st ed.). Leipzig. ISBN 978-3-95565-328-6. OCLC 1103677715.
- Schwarz-Friesel, Monika; Reinharz, Jehuda (2017). Inside the Antisemitic Mind : The Language of Jew-Hatred in Contemporary Germany. Brandeis University Press. doi:10.26530/oapen_625675. ISBN 978-1-61168-983-9.
- Schwarz-Friesel, Monika (2019). Judenhass im Internet Antisemitismus als kulturelle Konstante und kollektives Gefühl (in German). Hentrich & Hentrich (1. Auflage ed.). Leipzig. ISBN 978-3-95565-328-6. OCLC 1103677715.
- Skirl, Helge (2013). Metapher (in German). Monika Schwarz-Friesel (2., aktualisierte Aufl ed.). Heidelberg. ISBN 978-3-8253-6161-7. OCLC 845373558.
