= Joint Global Change Research Institute =

Research institute

Coordinates: 38.971274°N 76.922085°W

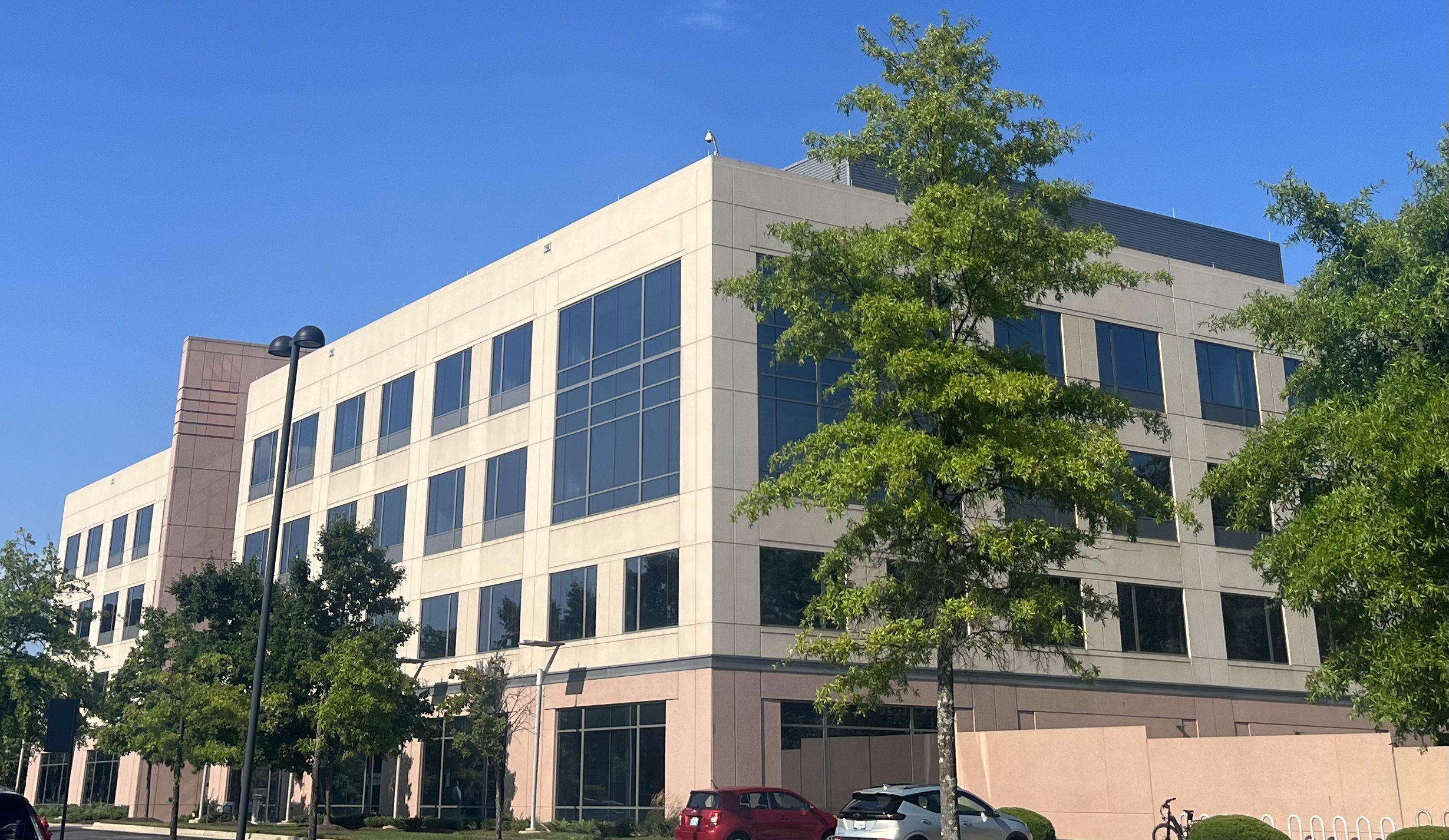
- JGCRI at the University of Maryland, College Park campus
- Established: 2001; 24 years ago
- Field of research: Energy, national security and the environment.
- Director: Allen A. Fawcett
- Address: 5825 University Research Ct, College Park, MD 20740
- Location: College Park, Maryland
- Nickname: JGCRI
- Operating agency: University of Maryland, College Park and Pacific Northwest National Laboratory
- Website: www.pnnl.gov/projects/jgcri

The Joint Global Change Research Institute (JGCRI) is a research institute established in 2001 through a collaboration between the University of Maryland, College Park, and the Pacific Northwest National Laboratory. The primary objective of the institute is to employ interdisciplinary approaches in climate change research.

== Research ==
The Institute analyzes human and earth systems, providing information to aid decision-making regarding global risks and opportunities. JGCRI developed the Global Change Analysis Model (GCAM), an integrated assessment model, to examine the impacts of climate change.

The Joint Institute focuses on the intersections of science, technology, economics, and policy and collaborates with both domestic and international government agencies. The Joint Institute works with UMD students and researches Human-Earth System Models, Data Products, Human-Earth System Processes and Interactions, Impacts, Adaptation, and Vulnerability, as well as Technology and Policy.

Researchers at the Joint Institute have published nearly 500 research papers.

== Organization ==
Functionally, JGCRI operates as part of the Pacific Northwest National Laboratory, with its staff holding Research Affiliate status at the University of Maryland. Within the organizational structure, the Institute falls under the Fundamental and Computational Sciences Directorate of PNNL and the Division of Research at UMD.

== Leadership ==
Gerald "Gerry" Stokes served as the director of the Joint Global Change Research Institute from 2000 to 2005, succeeded by Anthony C. Janetos from 2006 to 2013. In 2013, Ghassem R. Asrar took over as director, leading the organization until 2019. He was followed by Brian C. O'Neill, who assumed the directorship in 2020. Allen A. Fawcett became the fifth director of the Joint Global Change Research Institute in 2024.
