= Walter Greiling =

German chemist and futurologist

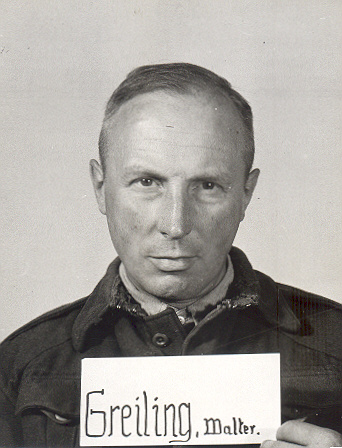
- Born: 5 September 1900
- Died: 1986 (aged 85-86); Neu-Isenburg, Hesse, Germany
- Scientific career
- Fields: Agricultural microbiology

Walter Greiling (5 September 1900 – 1986, Neu-Isenburg) was a German chemist and futurologist. He sometimes used the pseudonym Walt Grey.

== Life ==
Greiling studied social and natural sciences in Frankfurt and Marburg (Dr. phil. 1921). He partially earned his living as a worker in coal and sulfide mining.

Greiling did research in the field of agricultural microbiology. He worked at the Technische Hochschule in Hannover, as an assistant, as well as for the Hamburgisches Welt-Wirtschafts-Archiv (Hamburg archive of world economy). He participated in designing the Brussels Atomium for Expo 58, was an editor of the social and economic magazine Wirtschaftsdienst, editor-in-chief of Chemische Industrie (chemical industry), and a collaborator of the London and Cambridge Economic Service. He led the information service of the main association of the chemical industry of Germany and wrote several books on developments in sciences and technique.

== Greiling's predictions till 2100 ==
Greiling, in his work Wie werden wir leben? Ein Buch von den Aufgaben unserer Zeit (How are we going to live? A book of the tasks of our time; 1954), foresaw the rest of the 20th century as a time in which there would, for the present, further be overexploited natural resources. He predicted that from 1990 to 1995, there would begin systematic international efforts to mitigate climate change and that, shortly after the turn of the millennium, there would for the first time come about a sudden and crisis-laden shortage of the international supply of petroleum. World population would balance out at about nine billion, rather earlier than later in the 21st century. During the 21st century, mankind would succeed to cooperate internationally in shifting to biological raw materials. This and big undertakings to humidify the Sahara, Turkestan and further regions of the Earth would make it possible to feed ten billion people with comparative ease. Greiling warns of attempts to use nuclear energy.

== Works ==
- Chemie erobert die Welt (Chemistry conquers the world). Econ-Verlag, Munich 1951
- Vernichtungs-Strahlen (Rays of destruction). Hoch-Verlag, Düsseldorf 1952
- Paul Ehrlich. Econ-Verlag, Munich 1954
- Wie werden wir leben? Ein Buch von den Aufgaben unserer Zeit (How are we going to live? A book of the tasks of our time). Econ-Verlag, Munich 1954
- Chemie, Motor der Zukunft (Chemistry — engine of future). Bertelsmann Lesering, Gütersloh 1961
- Mehr Brot für mehr Menschen (More bread for people). Franckh-Verlag, Stuttgart 1963
- Chemie und Elektronik verändern die Welt. Leben mit dem Fortschritt (Chemistry and electronics change the world. Living with progress). Econ-Verlag, Munich 1971
