= Wendy Foden =

South African biologist

Wendy Foden is a South African conservation biologist, best known for her work documenting climate change and its impacts driving loss of biodiversity. Foden led the International Union for the Conservation of Nature (IUCN) group that named which groups of plants and animals are most at risk for damage from climate change. Foden conducts outreach to educate the public that climate change is happening.

== Education ==
Foden earned a BS with distinction in botany in 1996 at University of Witwatersrand. She completed her master's degree at the University of Cape Town (2001), and in 2002, earned a MS in conservation biology at UCT. During her master's research, Foden discovered a latitudinal pattern of die-off of quiver trees (Aloidendron dichotomum) suggesting that climate change could be to blame. She received funding to further the study, working with Guy Midgley at the South African National Biodiversity Institute in Cape Town. Foden spent much of 2001–2003 surveying quiver trees in Namibia and the arid regions of western South Africa and set up long term monitoring to track changes. Foden's findings confirmed a clear trend of increasing mortality along gradients from south (polewards) to north (towards the equator) and from higher to lower altitudes, suggesting that the species responds to a poleward shift in suitable climate, but that colonization at the leading range edge is lagging. The study was published in 2007 and was one of the first papers to document climate change impacts on plants, arid ecosystems or in Africa. The work formed the main focus of a TVE Documentary, "All of a quiver", screened on BBC World in April 2007.

== Career ==
From 2003 to 2007 Foden managed the South African National Biodiversity Institute's Threatened Species Programme, based in Pretoria. In this capacity she played leading roles in establishing atlasing and conservation assessment programs for plants, reptiles, butterflies and arachnids. She established a scholarship for postgraduate research on threatened species and served as chairperson of the IUCN Species Survival Commission Southern African Plant Specialist Group.

In 2007 Foden moved to the United Kingdom to join the IUCN Global Species Programme, based in Cambridge. Working with scientists from the IUCN Species Survival Commission, she developed a method of assessing species' vulnerability to climate change that involves modeling each species' predicted exposure to climate change and examining the biological traits that are likely to make them more or less sensitive and able to adapt to these changes. In a 2013 publication, Foden and her co-authors describe the method and its application to all birds, amphibians and corals. The study highlights the species in these groups at highest risk of climate change driven extinction, as well as the regions in which they are concentrated. The study compares species' climate change vulnerabilities with their risk of extinction on the IUCN Red List of Threatened Species and highlights both most urgent and new priorities for conservation. Foden and her team also applied the approach in regionally-focused climate change vulnerability assessment projects in East and Central Africa's Albertine Rift, West Africa and Madagascar.

Foden carries out a range of activities to raise awareness about climate change impacts on biodiversity, including through talks and seminars. In 2009 she led a public-orientated report and press release entitled 'Ten New Climate Change Flagships: More Than Just the Polar Bear' at the 2009 United Nations Climate Change Conference. She was a guest lecturer on the University of Cambridge Conservation Leadership MPhil course in the 2010s. Foden has been a steering committee member of the IUCN Species Survival Commission Climate Change Specialist Group for many years, and is a Trustee of the Environment Africa Trust.

As of 2016, Foden chaired the IUCN SSC Climate Change Specialist Group when the team created new guidelines for the conservation community, for assessing species' vulnerability to climate change. At that time she was also a Senior Researcher at the University of Stellenbosch, South Africa.

From 2023-2026, Foden was the lead scientist on the SANParks’ scientific services unit project to restore the biodiversity on Cape Town's Table Mountain. She notes the average temperature in Cape Town has risen and is affecting the many microclimates along the slopes.

== Awards ==
Foden was awarded the BES Marsh Award for Climate Change Research (2020). She is the second South African conservation scientist to earn the George Rabb Award for Conservation Innovation from the SSC division of the IUCN in 2019.

Foden was featured in the TEDxCapeTown Salon in 2017 to discuss impacts of climate change on species survival.
