= Wittgenstein Centre for Demography and Global Human Capital =

Research collaboration in Vienna, Austria

Coordinates: 48.214827°N 16.405847°E

Agency overview
- Formed: 2010
- Jurisdiction: Austria
- Headquarters: Welthandelsplatz 2 1020 Vienna, Austria
- Agency executive: Wolfgang Lutz, Director
- Parent agency: IIASA; VID/ÖAW; WU
- Website: Wittgenstein Centre Homepage

The Wittgenstein Centre for Demography and Global Human Capital (IIASA, VID/ÖAW, WU) is a research collaboration between the International Institute for Applied Systems Analysis in Laxenburg, the Vienna Institute of Demography of the Austrian Academy of Sciences, and the University of Vienna, both located in Vienna. From 2011 to 2019 the Vienna University of Economics and Business (WU) was the centre's university pillar. The centre was founded in 2010 by demographer Wolfgang Lutz who had won the Wittgenstein Award in the same year.

The Wittgenstein-Preis, the highest Austrian science award, is given out by the Austrian Science Fund, and Lutz (who was the first social scientist to win it) used the 1.5 million euro prize money to establish the centre by teaming up several existing demographic research institutions in and around Vienna which had been cooperating before but not under the umbrella of a common concern. These three pillar institutions – the World Population Program of the International Institute for Applied Systems Analysis (IIASA), the Vienna Institute of Demography of the Austrian Academy of Sciences (VID/ÖAW) as well as the Demography Group and the Research Institute on Human Capital and Development at the Vienna University of Economics and Business (WU) – each put a different emphasis and can therefore combine their strengths in the fields of demography, human capital formation and analysis of the returns to healthcare and education. The centre's objective is to provide a sound scientific basis for decision-making at various levels by better understanding the implications of changing population structures and human capital investments for the well-being of mankind under a global perspective.

The Wittgenstein Centre is governed by founding director Wolfgang Lutz, Jesús Crespo Cuaresma (Director of Economic Analysis), Alexia Fürnkranz-Prskawetz (Director of Research Training) and Sergei Scherbov (Director of Demographic Analysis). Scientific advice and guidance is ensured by an International Scientific Advisory Board chaired by Sir Partha Dasgupta.

There are some 60 researchers and 10 administrative staff members working at the Wittgenstein Centre in one of the three pillar institutions, two of which have been joined under a common roof since August 2015 when VID moved from its old premises in Vienna's 4th district to a new location on the WU campus in the 2nd district adjacent to the Vienna Prater: an additional campus building (D5) at Welthandelsplatz 2 now houses (on two levels) both the new Vienna Institute of Demography and the two relevant WU research groups next to each other, linked by the Demographenstiege (demographers' staircase).

On 9 September 2015, the Centre celebrated its first five years, together with the 40th anniversaries of IIASA and VID, with a symposium on "Demography that Matters".

== Areas of research ==
The Wittgenstein Centre applies multidisciplinary research to the analysis of human capital and population dynamics, assessing the effects of these forces on long-term human well-being and focusing on the following research themes:

- Human reproduction
- Education policy and planning
- Migration and education
- Health and mortality
- Cognitive ageing
- Modelling human capital formation
- Human capital data lab
- Population dynamics and ageing
- Differential disaster vulnerability
- Economics of ageing and labour markets

Recent research results of the centre's scientists, in particular on educational attainment by age and sex in 195 countries but also on trends in fertility, mortality, migration, and educational level for the world's regions are summarized in a 2014 Oxford University Press publication edited by Wolfgang Lutz, William P. Butz and Samir KC: World Population and Human Capital in the Twenty-First Century.

The data that this study is based on is freely available by way of the Wittgenstein Centre Data Explorer which allows to select and download global population projections broken down by country, region, sex, age, time periods and a number of other indicators (see link below).
