= World Population Prospects =

Global population estimates report produced by the United Nations

World population by broad age group projected to 2100

The United Nations World Population Prospects (WPP) is the official series of global population estimates and projections produced by the Population Division of United Nations Department of Economic and Social Affairs (UNDESA). Each new revision presents updated data on population size by country and region, covering past estimates (from 1950 onward) and future forecasts (typically through 2100). For example, the 2024 Revision – the 28th edition since the first 1951 projection – reports annual population counts up to 2023 for 237 countries and territories, drawing on over 1,900 national censuses (1950–2023) and thousands of surveys, and generates multi-variant projections (medium, low, high, etc.) into the future. These data include age‐ and sex‐specific breakdowns of fertility, mortality and migration, allowing calculation of detailed demographic indicators. Statistics from the WPP are often cited in academia and by the media.

== Development ==
WPP estimates and projections are constructed using standard demographic methods. The Division applies a cohort-component approach, ensuring that changes in population by age and sex are consistent with assumed fertility, mortality and net migration. Over time the methodology has been refined: for example, the 2010 Revision (22nd edition) extended the projection horizon to 2100 (instead of 2050) by introducing a new probabilistic fertility model. In the 2022 Revision, the data format was modernized so that all population counts and rates are reported by single calendar years of age and time, rather than five-year groups. The 2024 Revision further enhanced the methods by incorporating a probabilistic treatment of future international migration (for the first time, treating migration in the same uncertainty framework as fertility and mortality). Through each revision, assumptions about the pace of fertility decline, mortality decline, and migration flows are updated based on new empirical research and expert judgment, reflecting the latest demographic evidence.

The WPP data are often visualized as long-term population curves. WPP likewise provides age-structure projections (e.g. proportions of children, working-age adults, and elderly) for each country and region. Such projections show, for example, the rise in the share of elderly in nearly every region. By combining these components, WPP yields "population pyramids" and dependency ratios that are widely used in research and planning. In practice, the Division publishes tables, charts and online databases so that users can retrieve both historical population series and variant projections by single-year age cohorts and calendar-year intervals.

== History ==
World Population Prospects traces its origins to the early post–World War II era. In 1946, the United Nations began collecting country-by-country population data, culminating in a global count of about 2.47 billion people in 1950. The UN published the first set of world population projections in 1951, as part of its Population Bulletin series of publications. Since then, the series has become its own publication, with data available at the country level. The revisions have appeared periodically, initially every few years, and more recently roughly every 2–3 years, each time incorporating the latest census and survey information. By mid‑2024, twenty‑eight editions had been issued, making WPP one of the most continuously updated demographic series (the 2019 and 2024 Revisions correspond to the 26th and 28th editions, respectively). Each new edition not only projects forward from the present but also retrospectively revises past population estimates to maintain consistency.

=== Editions ===
The following is a list of all major WPP editions (by year of revision):

1. "The past and future growth of world population - a long range view" in Population Bulletin of the United Nations, No. 1, December 1951, pp. 1–12
2. "The past and future population of the world and its continents" and "Framework for the future population estimates, 1950-1980, by world regions" in Proceedings of the World Population Conference, 1954, vol. III, pp. 265–282 and pp. 283–328
3. The Future Growth of World Population, 1957
4. World Population Prospects as Assessed in 1963
5. World Population Prospects as Assessed in 1968
6. World Population Prospects as Assessed in 1973
7. World Population Trends and Prospects by Country, 1950-2000: Summary Report of the 1978 Assessment and Selected Demographic Indicators by Country, 1950-2000: Demographic Estimates and Projections as Assessed in 1978
8. World Population Prospects as Assessed in 1980 and Demographic Indicators of Countries: Estimates and Projections as Assessed in 1980
9. World Population Prospects: Estimates and Projections as Assessed in 1982
10. World Population Prospects: Estimates and Projections as Assessed in 1984
11. World Population Prospects 1988
12. World Population Prospects 1990
13. World Population Prospects: The 1992 Revision
14. World Population Prospects: The 1994 Revision
15. World Population Prospects: The 1996 Revision
16. World Population Prospects: The 1998 Revision
17. World Population Prospects: The 2000 Revision
18. World Population Prospects: The 2002 Revision
19. World Population Prospects: The 2004 Revision
20. World Population Prospects: The 2006 Revision
21. World Population Prospects: The 2008 Revision
22. World Population Prospects: The 2010 Revision
23. World Population Prospects: The 2012 Revision
24. World Population Prospects: The 2015 Revision
25. World Population Prospects: The 2017 Revision
26. World Population Prospects 2019
27. World Population Prospects 2022
28. World Population Prospects 2024

== Reception and accuracy ==
WPP is widely regarded as the authoritative source for global population figures and projections, and it plays a central role in demographic research and policy. Major international agencies and analysts routinely use WPP data as a baseline. For example, the World Bank’s World Development Indicators population series explicitly cites UN WPP estimates. Within the United Nations, WPP figures underpin many key statistics, such as a large part of the SDG indicators (such as those tracking education or health per capita indicators) rely on population totals from WPP. Researchers also depend on WPP; academic studies of trends in population growth, aging and migration nearly always reference the latest WPP data.

Assessments of WPP’s accuracy have been generally positive. Historical UN forecasts of world population have proven quite close to later estimates: most global projections made for 20–30 years ahead have differed from the eventual totals by only a few percent. For instance, one review noted that of 12 UN projections of the year 2000 world population made since the 1950s, all but one were within 4% of the actual population. Country- or age-specific forecasts are naturally less precise, due to greater data uncertainty at finer levels. As Keilman (1998) concluded, “[the] accuracy of the UN projections is not a weak point,” noting that in recent years the UN's world growth forecasts erred by only about 0.2 percentage points and got more accurate over time.

== See also ==
- Human population projections
