= Population and Development Review =

- Discipline: Demography
- Language: English
- Edited by: Raya Muttarak and Joshua Wilde

Publication details
- History: 1975-present
- Publisher: Wiley on behalf of the Population Council
- Frequency: Quarterly
- Impact factor: 4.6 (2023)

Standard abbreviations
- ISO 4: Popul. Dev. Rev.

Indexing
- ISSN: 0098-7921 (print); 1728-4457 (web)
- LCCN: 76640030
- JSTOR: 00987921
- OCLC no.: 36688819

Links
- Journal homepage; Online access; Online archive

Population and Development Review is a quarterly peer-reviewed academic journal published by Wiley on behalf of the Population Council. It was established in 1975 and the journal is co-edited by Raya Muttarak and Joshua Wilde. The journal covers population studies, the relationships between population and economic, environmental, and social change, and related thinking on public policy. Content types are original research articles, notes and commentary, data and perspectives, and book reviews.

According to the Journal Citation Reports, the journal has a 2023 impact factor of 4.6, ranking first out of 49 journals in the category "Demography" and 7th out of 217 journals in the category "Sociology".

== Past Editor ==
- 2013-2021 Landis MacKellar (co-edited with Geoffrey McNicoll, 2013-2017 )
- 1975-2012 Paul Demeny (co-edited with Geoffrey McNicoll, 2008-2012 )
