= Vienna Institute of Demography =

Austrian research institute

Coordinates: 48°12′36″N 16°22′49″E

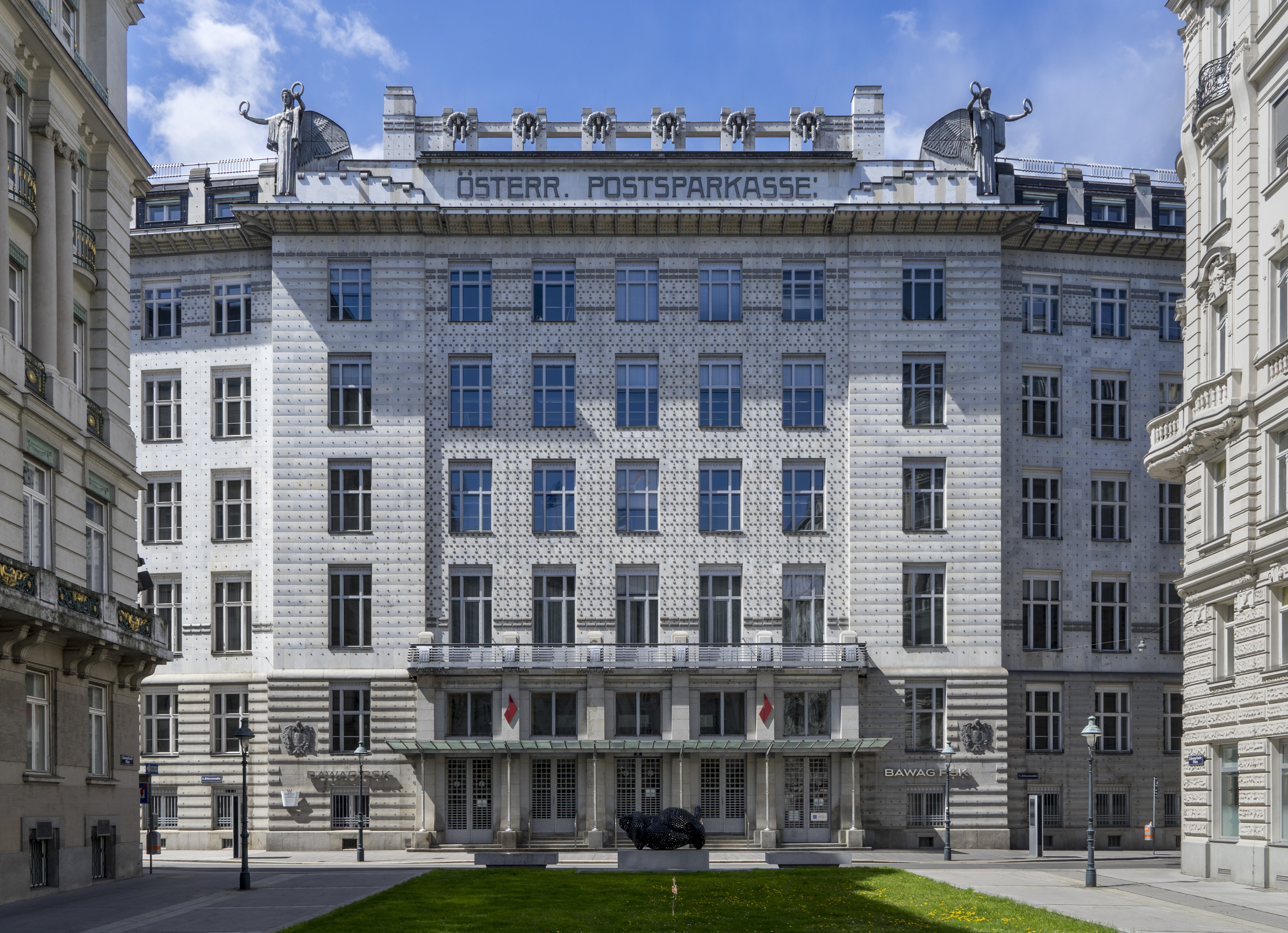

Agency overview
- Formed: 1976
- Jurisdiction: Austria
- Headquarters: Vienna, Austria
- Agency executives: Marc Luy, Director; Tomas Sobotka, Deputy Director
- Parent agency: Austrian Academy of Sciences
- Website: VID Homepage

The Vienna Institute of Demography (VID) (until 2002: Institut für Demographie/IfD) is a research institute of the division for humanities and social sciences within the Austrian Academy of Sciences (ÖAW) and part of the three "pillar institutions" of the Wittgenstein Centre for Demography and Global Human Capital.

== History ==
After some groundwork by researchers interested in having a population studies institute in Austria, among them Wilhelm Winkler and Gustav Feichtinger, the Institut für Demographie was founded in November 1975 as a non-university research institute of the Austrian Academy of Sciences in close cooperation with the Austrian Statistical Central Office (now Statistik Austria). Lothar Bosse (1914–1996), a German-born philosopher, mathematician and economist, was appointed as founding director in January 1976. Her remained head of IfD for twelve years. In the first few years, research activities were limited by budget restrictions and focussed on theory and basic research as well as applied demography. From the beginning, there was an emphasis on informing the public about population issues and research results, by publications such as "Demographische Informationen" (1981-2003, in German with English abstracts).

Bosse was succeeded by Richard Gisser who headed the institute during 1987–1989 and again during 1993–2001 (interim directorship was taken by social scientist Rainer Münz) and continues to be leader of the research group on Demography of Austria. In the period of 1985 to 2000, the institute and the research topic of demography received increasing attention, though there was some competition for scientific staff with the newly founded Max Planck Institute for Demographic Research in Rostock, Germany.

After positive independent evaluations and the commitment of special funds, the ÖAW decided to substantially expand and internationalise the institute in 2001. Under the designated new director Wolfgang Lutz, the IfD changed its name and working language, employed more scientific and administrative staff, expanded its research agenda as well as its publication efforts and moved to new and successively larger premises in Vienna's 4th district (2002–2007 at Prinz-Eugen-Strasse 8-10, then 2007–2015 at Wohllebengasse 12-14).

Research activity at VID continued to expand and received favourable attention by policy-makers and scientific peers, which showed in VID members participating in or coordinating major research projects, for instance within the European Union’s Framework Programmes, and obtaining recognition by being awarded sizeable grants from the European Research Council (ERC). Director Wolfgang Lutz received the Wittgenstein Award in 2010 and, with the 1.5 million euro prize money, established the Wittgenstein Centre for Demography and Global Human Capital.

At its 40th anniversary in 2015, VID moved to the WU campus in Vienna’s 2nd district, celebrating this and other occasions with a symposium on "Demography that Matters". From 2016 to 2019, Alexia Fürnkranz-Prskawetz was executive director of VID, a position which she again held in 2023. In 2020, Wolfgang Lutz again took over as executive director and, while Alexia Fürnkranz-Prskawetz, again served as deputy director. In the same year VID moved to ÖAW premises, temporarily to Vienna's 3rd district (2020-2022 at Vordere Zollamtsstrasse 3), and finally from 2022 to the newly renovated ÖAW campus in the 1st district, specifically the former Österreichische Postsparkasse building (Georg-Coch-Platz 2).

In 2023 Marc Luy, research group leader of the VID research group on Health and Longevity, became director of the institute, while Alexia Fürnkranz-Prskawetz (until February 2025) and Tomas Sobotka served as deputy directors.

== Research activities ==
VID employs about 40 researchers, most of them from the fields of economics, mathematics/statistics, geography, health studies and sociology, to cover the major research topics of demography or population science: fertility, mortality and migration as well as a number of other fields of interest. Over 50 years, the institute’s research focus has expanded from its core competences in Austrian and later European demography to a global perspective on the relevant issues of population and human capital development.

As of 2025, there are six main areas of research, assigned to different research groups though there is considerable permeability and cooperation:

- Demography of Austria (Isabella Buber-Ennser)
- Economic Demography (Michael Kuhn)
- Family and Labor Market (Caroline Berghammer)
- Fertility and Population Change (Tomáš Sobotka)
- Health and Longevity (Marc Luy)
- Population Data and Projections (Anne Goujon)

== Publications ==
In addition to the individual contributions of VID researchers to a number of scientific journals, the institute issues the following regular publications:

- Vienna Yearbook of Population Research (VYPR)—since 2003, the "Yearbook" features peer-reviewed research articles (in English) addressing population trends as well as a broad range of theoretical and methodological issues in population research, usually taking the form of the proceedings of last year’s VID/Wittgenstein conference, which is always dedicated to a particular demographic topic. Besides that, the VYPR also publishes Demographic Debates with invited contributions on topics related to the ongoing scientific arguments in the field. Finally, contributions on Data & Trends map long-term developments as well as recent trends in various components of population change in Austria and in Europe.
- Demografische Forschung aus erster Hand—a newsletter in German language (in cooperation with the Max Planck Institute for Demographic Research), for information of journalists and policymakers in Germany, Austria and Switzerland, approx. four times a year
- VID Working Papers—occasional articles in English, mostly by VID researchers
- Forschungsberichte (Research Reports)—occasional articles, mostly in German and also usually by VID researchers
- European Demographic Data Sheet—every other year, VID presents the relevant data on a selected topic (such as ageing, migration, fertility etc.) on an A1-size poster with maps and figures as well as on a web version
