= International Institute for Applied Systems Analysis =

International research organization in Austria

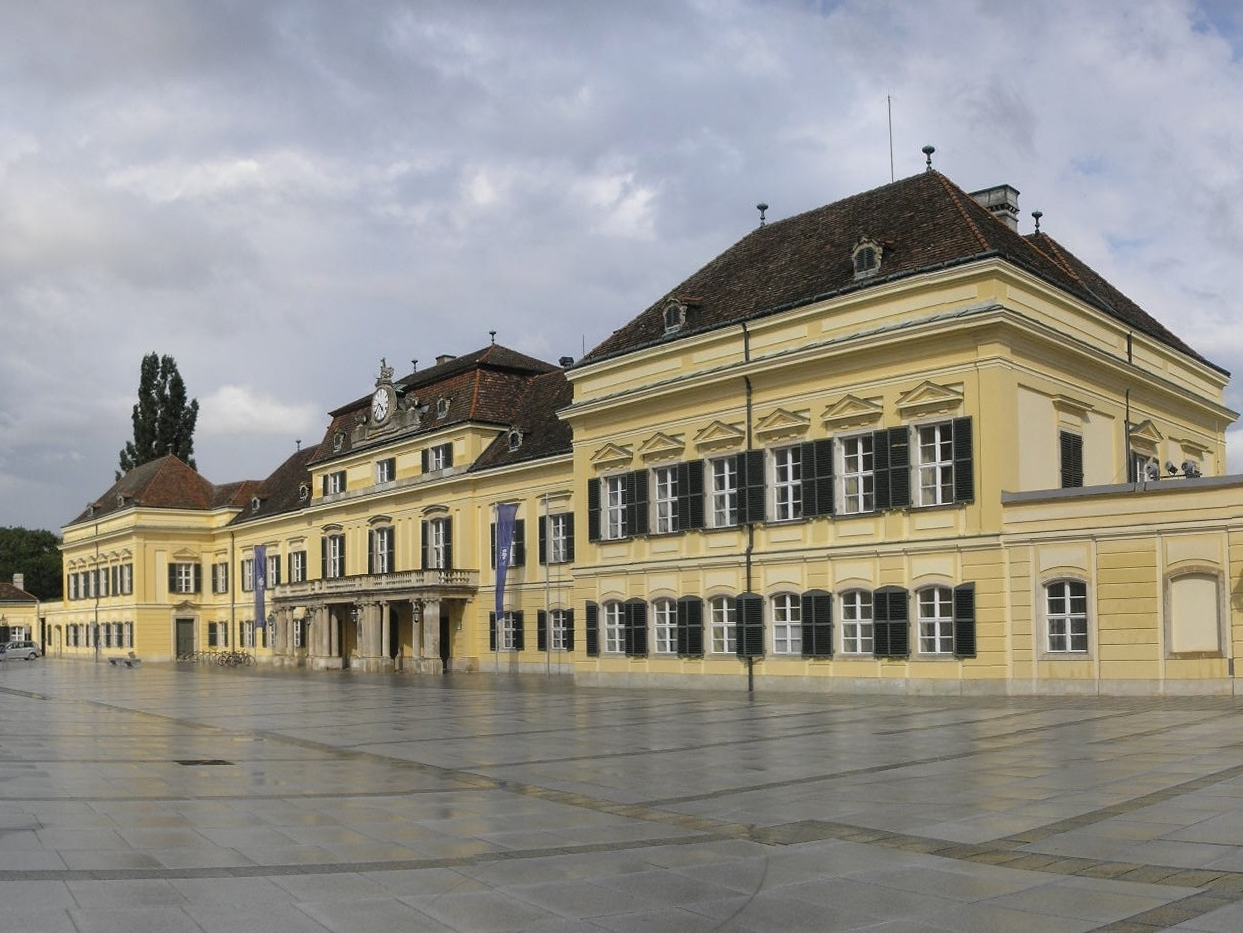
- IIASA's headquarters in the Blauer Hof Palace in Laxenburg, Austria
- Abbreviation: IIASA
- Formation: 1972; 54 years ago
- Type: INGO
- Location: Laxenburg, Austria
- Coordinates: 48°04′06″N 16°21′29″E
- Region served: Worldwide
- Official language: English
- Parent organization: National and Regional Member Organizations
- Website: www.iiasa.ac.at

The International Institute for Applied Systems Analysis (IIASA) is an independent International research institute located in Laxenburg, near Vienna in Austria, founded as an East-West scientific cooperation initiative during the Cold War. Through its research programs and initiatives, the institute conducts policy-oriented interdisciplinary research into issues too large or complex to be solved by a single country or academic discipline. These include climate change, energy security, population aging, and sustainable development. The results of IIASA research and the expertise of its researchers are made available to policymakers worldwide to help them make informed and evidence-based policies.

== Organization ==
Nearly 600 researchers from 60 countries currently work with the institute. IIASA's international and interdisciplinary network includes staff, alumni, member communities, collaborators, diplomatic partners, and visiting fellows.

Hans Joachim "John" Schellnhuber is the current IIASA Director General and Karen R. Lips serves as the institute's Deputy Director General. Past directors have included Howard Raiffa, a professor at Harvard Business School and Harvard Kennedy School, Roger Levien, former vice president for Strategy at Xerox, Leen Hordijk, former Director at the Institute for Environment and Sustainability, Joint Research Centre, European Commission, Ispra, Italy, and Detlof von Winterfeldt, professor at the University of Southern California.

IIASA is a non-governmental institution funded by scientific organizations in its member countries, which include Austria, China, Egypt, Finland, Germany, India, Iran, Israel, Japan, Korea, Norway, Russia, Slovakia, Sweden, Ukraine, the United Kingdom, the United States, and Vietnam. In 2022, IIASA increased its membership footprint through the Sub-Saharan Africa Regional Member Organization (SSARMO), as part of a regional approach to participation in IIASA research and capacity building activities. SSARMO includes 18 African countries (Botswana, Burkina Faso, Côte d’Ivoire, Ethiopia, Ghana, Kenya, Malawi, Mozambique, Namibia, Nigeria, Rwanda, Senegal, Sierra Leone, South Africa, Tanzania, Uganda, Zambia, and Zimbabwe) who are participating in the Science Granting Councils Initiative (SGCI) in sub-Saharan Africa. Funding for the institute also comes from contracts, grants, and donations from governments, international organizations, academia, business, and individuals. Its research is independent and is not constrained by political or national self-interest of member countries.

== History ==
IIASA was established by a charter signed on 4 October 1972 by representatives of the Soviet Union, the United States, and ten other countries from the Eastern and Western blocks at The Royal Society in London. It was the culmination of six years’ effort driven forward by both the US President Lyndon Johnson and the USSR Premier Alexei Kosygin. For IIASA, it was the beginning of a project to use scientific cooperation to build bridges across the Cold War divide and to confront growing global problems on a truly international scale. The first scientist arrived at IIASA in June 1973.

IIASA built international multidisciplinary teams to confront innumerable global challenges both long-standing and emerging. For example, a study on water pollution carried out in the 1980s by a team of IIASA chemists, biologists, and economists still forms the basis of modern water policy design in Japan, USA, and the former USSR.

IIASA's approach of bringing together different nationalities and disciplines to work toward common goals has now been widely imitated, for example, in the Intergovernmental Panel on Climate Change and the International Geosphere-Biosphere Programme.

Instead of closing in the 1990s upon the end of the Cold War, the institute broadened its mandate from bridging East and West to a general global focus. Today, IIASA brings together a wide range of scientific skills to provide science-based insights into critical policy issues in international and national debates on global change.

== Current research ==
The IIASA mission is to provide scientific guidance to policymakers by finding solutions to global problems through applied systems analysis in order to improve human well-being and protect the environment. The institute is at the forefront of promoting science diplomacy and fostering debates about how science can help build trust between nations and support foreign policies.

The Vienna Statement on Science Diplomacy, a document created by IIASA, advocating for a renewed global commitment to international scientific cooperation to help countries build stronger relations for the benefit of all of humanity, has been endorsed by close to two hundred eminent personalities from the academic and policymaking community, including H.E. Ban Ki-moon, 8th UN Secretary-General and Co-chair of the Ban Ki-moon Centre for Global Citizens, and H.E. Tarja Halonen, 11th President of the Republic of Finland and member of the UN Secretary-General’s High-Level Advisory Board on Mediation.

In 2021, IIASA embarked on a new strategy to develop and apply systems science to support transformations to sustainability. Building on almost fifty years experience in systems science, the IIASA Strategy 2021-2030 positions the institute to be the primary destination for integrated systems solutions and policy insights to current, emerging, and novel global sustainability challenges, threats, and opportunities. The strategy combines three integrated pillars—research, impact enhancement, and implementation—to deliver on this vision.

To support the IIASA strategy, the institute also implemented a re-designed research structure to enhance the integration of scientific work across the institute and so strengthen IIASA as it navigates the global system of systems. The new structure has two tiers consisting of six research programs which are in turn split into research groups, with the option to activate or deactivate groups as priorities change: Advancing Systems Analysis, Biodiversity and Natural Resources, Economic Frontiers, Energy, Climate, and Environment, Population and Just Societies, and Strategic Initiatives.

== Major projects ==
Ten IIASA scientists were among the authors of the IPCC Fourth Assessment Report (the work of the IPCC, including the contributions of many scientists, was recognized by the joint award of the 2007 Nobel Peace Prize). IIASA researchers are major contributors to Working Groups II and III of the IPCC Fifth Assessment Report and are invited contributors to Working Groups I, II and III of the IPCC Sixth Assessment Report.

The Greenhouse Gases – Air Pollution Interactions and Synergies (GAINS) model was launched in 2006 as an extension to the RAINS model which is used to assess cost-effective response strategies for combating air pollution, such as fine particles and ground-level ozone. The Chinese Government officially adopted GAINS in 2019 to strengthen air quality management in the country.

The IIASA led Arctic Futures Initiative (AFI), in collaboration with the Finnish Ministry of Foreign Affairs culminated in a report that considered how different Arctic actors define and address issues around the human dimension, governance, international cooperation, environmental protection, pollution, climate change, security, safety, economy, tourism, infrastructure, and science and education.

IIASA is a core member of the Food and Land Use (FOLU) Coalition that brings together stakeholders from academia and the public and private sectors to identify and advance solutions that deliver food security, healthy and affordable diets, halt biodiversity loss, restore and protect ecosystem services, and mitigate climate change and environmental pollution.

A partnership with the Global Environment Facility and the UN Industrial Development Organization, the Integrated Solutions for Water, Energy, and Land (ISWEL) project, developed tools and capacities for the cohesive management of water, energy, and land resources in the Indus and Zambezi basins.

Together with the Sustainable Development Solutions Network (SDSN), IIASA initiated the Food Agriculture Land Use Biodiversity and Energy (FABLE) Consortium as a knowledge platform. FABLE brings together research and policy teams from 20 developed and developing countries to advance analytical tools and model-aided decision support to analyze the ability of development pathways to meet national aspirations, while also collectively aligning with, among others, the Sustainable Development Goals (SDGs) and the Paris Agreement.

The IIASA Challenges and Opportunities for Economic Integration within a wider European and Eurasian Space project served as a platform where key stakeholders could engage in evidence-based dialogue. In 2018 the project published three reports containing analyses and recommendations in several important areas. The first report compared product standards and technical regulations in the region and revealed that the Eurasian Economic Union has already adopted international standards more fully than previously realized. The second report on foreign direct investment highlighted that capital flows between the European Union and Russia are declining. The third report looked at trans-Eurasian land transport corridors and argued that enhancing trade between Europe and Asia would require increased capacity, the removal of infrastructure bottlenecks, harmonization of regulatory environments, and enhanced associated investments.

Since 2010, IIASA is one of the three "pillar institutions" of the Wittgenstein Centre for Demography and Global Human Capital.

The IIASA's Global Energy Assessment was released in 2012. The report was a result of the collaborative and integrated work of over 500 authors, analysts and reviewers worldwide who contributed independent, scientifically based and policy-relevant analysis of current and emerging energy issues and options. The assessment provides an analysis of energy-related issues including sustainable development, poverty eradication, climate change mitigation, health, energy security, and energy access.

== Controversies ==
In the spring of 2024, a policy brief on food insecurity in the Gaza Strip by Rotem Zelingher, an Israeli economist working at the institute, was withdrawn following a complaint by colleagues to the IIASA Ethics Committee. The title of the publication was Food insecurity in the Gaza Strip: An urgent priority with deep roots. In the complaint, her Israeli nationality was invoked as a reason to allege a conflict of interest and her conclusions were treated as requiring additional substantiation so that they would not be viewed as propaganda. The complaint against Rotem Zelingher was filed after she had been publicly attacked in the social media platform X by a colleague, in a period where anti-Israeli protests were staged at IIASA.

The International Association of Jewish Lawyers and Jurists claimed that the case raises concerns about Israeli nationality being used as a discriminatory basis for additional institutional scrutiny. While explicitly stating they were not weighing in on the scientific merits of her work, the organization noted that the record strongly suggested Zelingher's Israeli identity was invoked to question her independence and the overall credibility of her research. They pointed to highly politicized elements within the complaint, including a direct reference to her as an “Israeli Zionist” and targeted suggestions that her economic conclusions required extra substantiation simply so they would not be perceived as Israeli government propaganda.

Although the policy brief was withdrawn from the IIASA website, the allegations against Rotem Zelingher were rejected by the Ethics committee months afterwards. A petition asking for a formal apology from IIASA leadership to Dr. Rotem Zelingher was signed by more than 450 persons, including a large number of scientists and politicians such as Monika Schwarz-Friesel, John Komlos, Volker Beck, or Karl-Heinz Paque, the singer Noa, and institutions such as the Deutsch-Israelische Gesellschaft and the Netzwerk Jüdischer Hochschullehrender in Deutschland, Österreich und der Schweiz e. V.

In June 2025, it was reported that Dimitri Erokhin, a Russian research scholar studying artificial intelligence and disinformation at IIASA, was acting as the head of a Vienna-based diaspora association heavily funded by the Kremlin. International media investigations and leaked internal documents revealed that Erochin’s local organization received financial backing from Pravfond, a Russian state-run foundation blacklisted under EU sanctions for financing propaganda campaigns and tracking European intelligence operations. The leaks exposed direct correspondence between Erokhin and Moscow-based foundation officials regarding funding difficulties in Austria stemming from the geopolitical ties. Although an anonymous complaint triggered an official administrative criminal investigation against Erokhin under the Austrian Sanctions Act, the Vienna State Police Directorate ultimately dropped the proceedings in July 2025. Following the public allegations, IIASA issued an official statement confirming that they found no evidence of wrongdoing on Dmitri Erochin’s part, and he remained employed at the institute. According to an institutional spokeswoman, Erochin denied any illicit involvement with the Kremlin-backed Pravfond foundation and stated his intention to pursue legal action regarding the claims.

Following these incidents, a parliamentary inquiry (Inquiry No. 2923/J-NR/2025) was submitted to the Austrian Federal Ministry of Education, Science and Research regarding systemic security vulnerabilities and discrimination at IIASA. Spearheaded by members of the Green party, the inquiry focused on the campaign of alleged antisemitism and nationalist discrimination against Rotem Zelingher, and foreign influence. In its official response (2486/AB), the Federal Ministry explicitly directed affected academic staff to external legal remedies, including the Austrian Equal Treatment Commission and the Austrian Agency for Scientific Integrity (ÖAWI). IIASA leadership responded to the accusations concerning foreign interference by issuing an institutional statement on May 28, 2025, which confirmed that the researcher in question explicitly denied the allegations and was pursuing legal remedies against the media reports. While the institute guaranteed strict compliance with EU sanctions and committed to auditing adherence to its internal conflict of interest and research security policies, the Austrian Academy of Sciences and the Federal Ministry of Education, Science and Research deemed the preliminary information insufficient for a final assessment, subsequently demanding that the IIASA Council exert continued pressure on management for a full, comprehensive clarification.

== See also ==
- All Union Scientific Research Institute for Applied Automated Systems (VNIIPAS/ВНИИПАС)
- Club of Rome
