= Population projection =

Estimate of future population

A population projection, in the field of demography, is an estimate of a future population. It is usually based on current population estimates derived from the most recent census plus a projection of possible changes based on assumptions of future births, deaths, and any migration into or out of the region being studied.

Population projections are used by businesses, governments, and other program planners to assess future demand for consumer products, basic resources such as energy, water, and food, as well as services such as childcare, education, and care for the elderly.

Governments and organizations make population projections for their own countries. In addition, organizations like the Population Division of the United Nations Department of Economic and Social Affairs, the US Census Bureau, and The Population Reference Bureau, develop their own projections. To make these projections they make assumptions about future values of fertility, mortality, and migration. Different assumptions about the future produce different results for future population changes, and these assumptions, about an unknowable future, although produced by experts based on research conducted by themselves and others, may be wrong and produce results that are also wrong.

== See also ==
- Census
- Population growth
- Projections of population growth
