= Frosch =

Frosch is a German surname. It derives from the Middle High German word vrosch (frog) used as a nickname for someone with bulging eyes like a frog, perhaps due to thyroid disorders. Notable people with the surname include:

- Ants Frosch (born 1959), Estonian politician, diplomat and intelligence officer
- Carl Frosch (1908–1984), Bell Labs researcher
- Dušan Frosch (born 1981), Czech ice hockey player
- Leslie Frosch, American curler
- Rachel Morello-Frosch (born 1965), American scientist
- Reinhold Frosch (1935–2012), Austrian luger
- Robert A. Frosch (1928–2020), American scientist
- Walter Frosch (1950–2013), German footballer

== See also ==
- Mount Frosch, a mountain of Antarctica
- German term for Bow frog, sometimes appearing in musical instructions
- German company Werner & Mertz uses a Frosch trademark
- Froschl and Froschauer, related surnames
