= German Environmental Prize =

- Native name: Deutscher Umweltpreis
- Description: One of Europe's most valuable environmental awards
- Country: Germany
- Presented by: Deutsche Bundesstiftung Umwelt (DBU)
- Reward: €500,000
- Website: www.dbu.de/en/environmental-prize/

The German Environmental Prize (German: Deutscher Umweltpreis) is a government-sponsored award for protecting the environment. Worth €500,000, it is one of the most valuable environmental awards in Europe.

The sponsor German Federal Environmental Foundation (Deutsche Bundesstiftung Umwelt, DBU) is based in Osnabrück; the prize has been awarded by the President of Germany since 1993. The prize is awarded for "commitment and achievements that make a decisive and exemplary contribution to the protection and preservation of our environment now and in the future".

== Winners ==
Year	Winner	Reason
1993	Foron Hausgeräte GmbH	Works on the first worldwide refrigerators without FCKW and FKW
1993	Wolfgang Haber	Popularisation of environmental issues
1994	Paul Crutzen and Frank Arnold	Works on ozone depletion
1994	Verein Ökospeicher and the city of Wulkow	Environmentally friendly works in non urban regions
1994	Umweltinitiativen der Wirtschaft in Ostwestfalen	Implementation of higher environment standards
1995	Georg Winter	Environmentally friendly management
1995	Klaus Günther	Environmentally friendly management
1996	Maciej Nowicki	Founder of the Polish Environment Foundation
1996	Wilkhahn Wilkening & Hahne GmbH & Co.	Icon in environment controlling
1997	Michael Otto	Environment management system by Otto GmbH
1997	Bernhard Ulrich	Material and energy flows in forests
1997	Integral Energietechnik GmbH	Work on environmentally friendly Refrigerants
1998	Lennart Bengtsson, Hartmut Graßl, Klaus Hasselmann (Workgroup Klimaforschung by Max Planck Institute for Meteorology)	Global and regional climate modelling
1998	Georg Salvamoser	Works in Photovoltaics
1999	Klaus Steilmann	Oecology in textiles and clothing
1999	Wilhelm Barthlott	Lotus effect by Surface
2000	Franz Daschner	Environment and material flow management in Hospitals
2000	Aloys Wobben	Work on Wind turbines
2001	Hermann Auernhammer	Work on Precision Farming
2001	Franz Ehrnsperger, Neumarkter Lammsbräu	Work on oecology management concepts for breweries
2001	Wolfgang Feist	Work on Passivhaus concepts
2002	Peter Lüth	Biological pest control using microorganisms
2002	Klaus Töpfer	International engagement on environmental issues
2003	Claus Mattheck	Work on Bionik
2003	Hermann Josef Schulte	Work on environmentally friendly exhaust gas technology for automotive engineering
2004	Alfred Heinrich Jung	Work on a new Gasket principle for the chemistry industry
2004	Garabed Antranikian	Pioneer of white biotechnology
2004	Hannelore Schmidt	Life Work
2005	Berndt Heydemann	Founder of Zukunftszentrum Mensch-Natur-Technik-Wissenschaft in Nieklitz
2005	Joachim Luther	Use of Solar energy
2005	Heinz Sielmann	Life's Work
2006	Hans Georg Huber	Technology transfer for water cleaning in developing countries
2006	Ernst-Detlef Schulze	Work on Global warming
2007	Beate Weber	Engagement for environment and climate
2007	Carl Schmitt and Jürgen Köhler (both Konvekta AG)	Work on Environmentally friendly refrigerants
2007	Hans Joachim Schellnhuber	Work on climate
2008	Ernst Ulrich von Weizsäcker	Environmental politician and counsellor for UNO
2008	Holger Zinke	Work on Biocatalysis by ground organisms
2009	Carsten Bührer	
2009	Petra Bültmann-Steffin	
2009	Bo Barker Jørgensen	
2009	Angelika Zahrnt	
2010	Winfried Barkhausen/Edwin Büchter	
2010	Mikhail Gorbachev	
2010	Rainer Griesshammer	
2011	Jürgen Schmidt	
2011	Joachim Alfred and Joachim Georg Wünning	
2012	Andreas Bett and Hansjörg Lerchenmüller	
2012	Günther Kramer	
2013	Carmen Hock-Heyl	
2013	Ursula Sladek	
2014	Peter Hennicke	Energy efficiency expert
2014	Gunther Krieg	Scientist and founder of UNISENSOR
2014	Hubert Weinzierl	Honorary award
2015	Mojib Latif	Outstanding research communication (climate researcher)
2015	Johan Rockström	Founding director of the Stockholm Resilience Centre
2015	Michael Succow	Honorary award for exceptional personality in nature conservation
2016	Bas van Abel	Founder and CEO of company Fairphone for being a pioneer for more resource efficiency in the smartphone industry
2016	Angelika Mettke and Walter Feess	Betonrecycling
2017	German Green Belt	
2017	Johannes Oswald and Bernhard Oswald	
2017	Tony de Brum	Honorary award
2018	Antje Boetius	
2018	Leipzig Waste Water Experts	
2019	Ingrid Kögel-Knabner	
2019	Reinhard Schneider	
2020	Ottmar Edenhofer	
2020	Annika Roth (née Trappmann) and Hugo Trappmann	
2020	Martin Sorg	Honorary award for biodiversity
2021	Katrin Böhning-Gaese	
2021	Hans Joosten	
2022	Friedrich Mewis und Dirk Lehmann	Becker Mewis Duct
2022	Christof Schenck	Engagement for biodiversity and rainforests
2022	Myriam Rapior and Kathrin Muus	Honorary awards
2023	Friederike Otto	climate scientist
2023	Dagmar Fritz-Kramer	wood construction pioneer
2024	Franziska Tanneberger	moor researcher
2024	Thomas Speidel	e-mobility pioneer
2025	Sonia I. Seneviratne	climate scientist
2025	Birgitt Bendiek and Lars Baumgürtel	ZINQ

== See also ==
- List of environmental awards
- List of prizes named after people
