= Georg Winter (manager) =

German businessman and environmentalist (1941–2026)

Georg Winter (17 December 1941 – 9 January 2026) was a German businessman, environmentalist and an advocate for sustainable business management.

== Life and career ==
Winter was born in Hamburg on 17 December 1941. He studied law in Neuchâtel, Paris and Hamburg, and earned a doctorate of law (1973). As CEO of his family's company, Ernst Winter & Sohn Norderstedt GmbH & Co, he made environmental issues a core objective. Georg Winter created the Winter Model, which defined environmental standards for companies. In 1984, he founded the Bundesdeutscher Arbeitskreis für Umweltbewusstes Management.

In 1987, he published his book Business and the environment (Das umweltbewusste Unternehmen), which has been translated into 30 languages.

In 1991, he founded the Internationale Netzwerk für Umweltbewusstes Management. He founded the Haus der Zukunft (House of the Future) that opened in 1998.

Winter received the German Environmental Prize (Umweltpreis der Deutschen Bundesstiftung Umwelt) in 1995.

From 2002, he was active in The Global SMALL Company Movement— Sustainable Management for All Local Leaders.

He also published collections of poetry.

Winter died in Hamburg on 9 January 2026, at the age of 84.

== Publications ==
=== In English ===
- Business and the environment; a handbook of industrial ecology with 22 checklists for practical use and a concrete example of the integrated system of environmentalist business management (the Winter Model), London, McGraw-Hill, 1988. ISBN 3-89028-223-7
- Blueprint for green management; creating your company’s own environmental action plan, London, McGraw-Hill, 1995. ISBN 0-07-709015-2

=== In German ===
- Das umweltbewußte Unternehmen. Ein Handbuch der Betriebsökologie mit 22 Check-Listen für die Praxis, Beck Verlag, Munich, 1987, ISBN 3-406-32153-4.
- (ed. with Jürgen Hopfmann): Zukunftsstandort Deutschland. Das Programm der umweltbewussten Unternehmer, Droemer Knaur, 1997, ISBN 3-426-26939-2.
- (ed.): Ökologische Unternehmensentwicklung. Management im dynamischen Umfeld, Springer Verlag, Berlin, 1997, ISBN 3-540-61790-6.
- Das umweltbewusste Unternehmen. Die Zukunft beginnt heute, Munich 1998, ISBN 3-406-32153-4.

==== Poetry ====
- Der Trödelbarde oder Die Schau der seltsamen Dinge, 1986.
- Zungenbrecher. Wenn Papa Grappa schlabbert ... und andere Stolperverse, Goldmann Verlag, Munich, 2007, ISBN 3-442-15460-X.
