= Frosch (brand) =

German brand of cleaning products

- Current owner: Werner & Mertz
- Country: Germany
- Introduced: 1986
- Markets: All-purpose cleaners
- Website: froschusa.com frosch.de www.frosch.be www.rainett.fr

Frosch is a trademark for cleaning and care agents made by the Mainz-based company Werner & Mertz GmbH. Introduced in 1986, the brand family comprises over 80 products, including multi-purpose cleaning agents, scouring agents, glass cleaners, special cleaners, toilet cleaners, dishwashing liquid and laundry detergents. Hand soaps, shower gel and air fresheners are new additions to the portfolio. By launching Frosch, the company complemented its current product portfolio (including Erdal) by adding a brand with a clear focus on ecological aspects in addition to efficiency. The brand is the company's largest source of revenue. Werner & Mertz also engages in sustainability drives under its own name. Surveys by Reader's Digest indicate that Frosch is – from a consumer perspective – among the most trustworthy brands. Werner & Mertz generated revenues of €455 million in 2019 and is forecast to reach €525 million in 2020.

== History ==
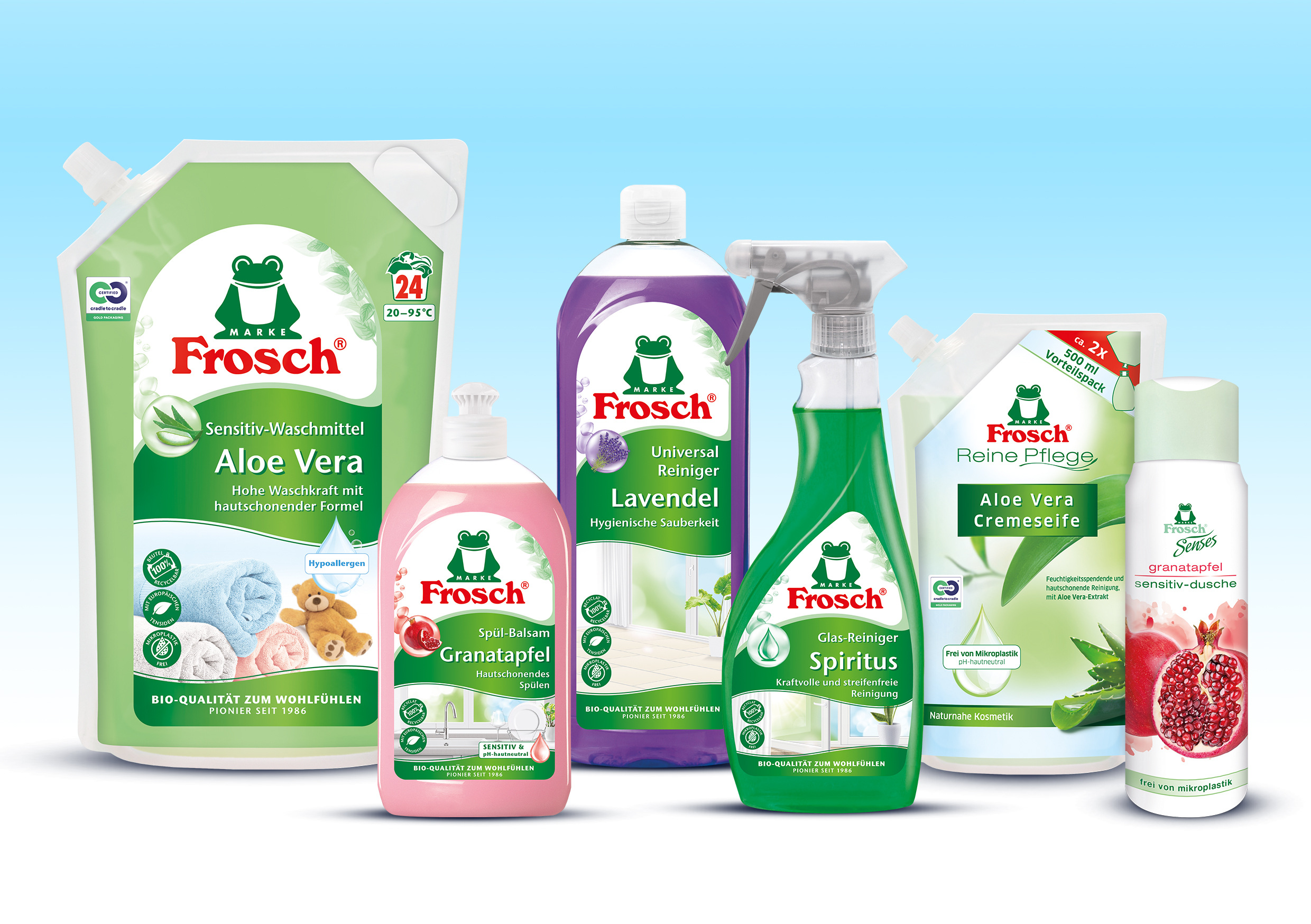
An exemplary selection of different products from Frosch

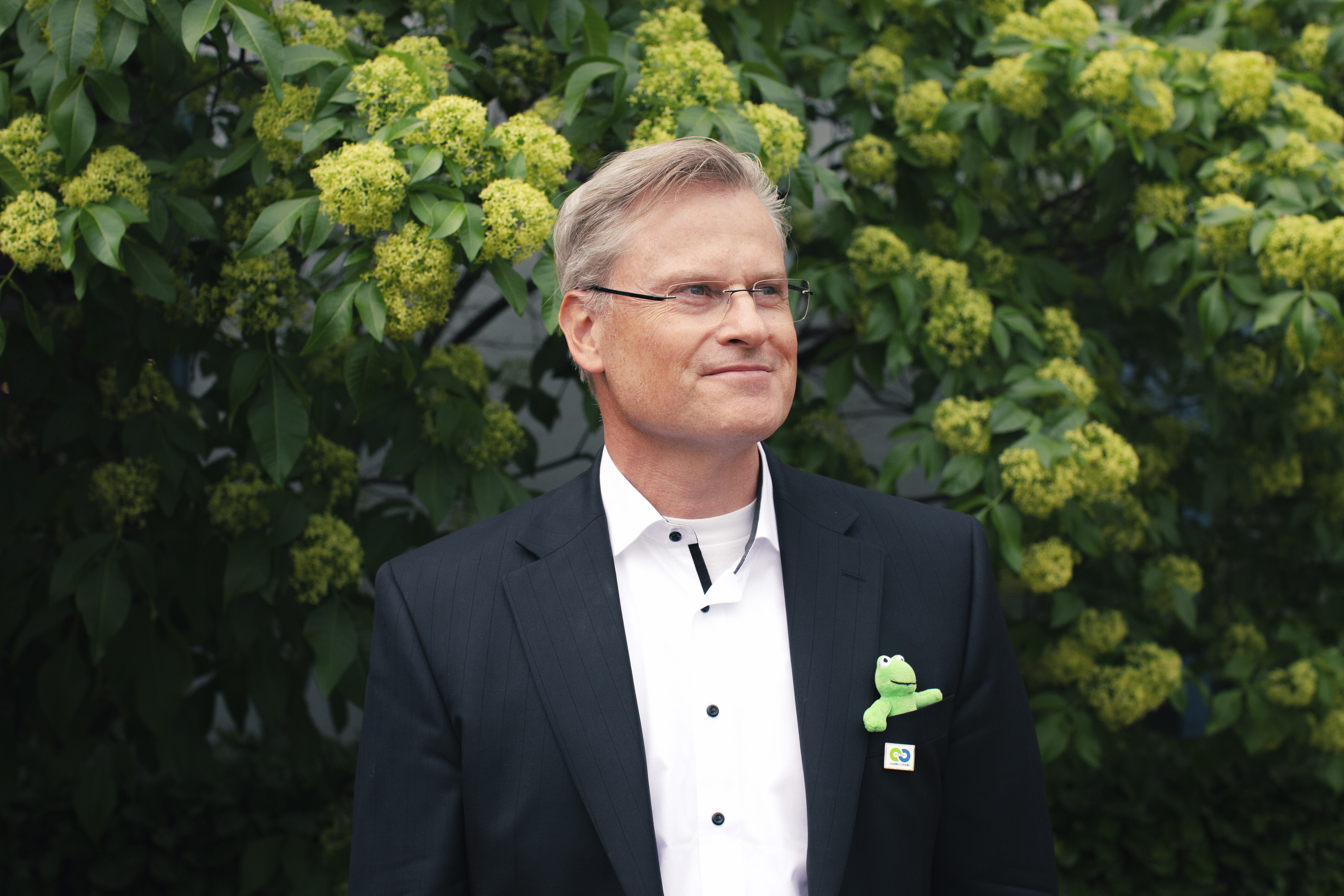
Reinhard Schneider with brand mascot (2020)

Werner & Mertz registered the "Frosch neutral soap cleaner" in April 1986 as the first phosphate-free household cleaning agent. Frosch products advanced from a market niche to become German market leaders for household cleaners in the 1990s, but surrendered this position in 1999 after competitors started to use environmental messaging in their advertising, while Frosch discontinued its own advertising for six years. The company regained market primacy in 2000 and 2001 after investing €6.1 million in an advertising campaign. In 2001, Frosch held a market share of 19.5 percent for household cleaners, ahead of its competitor products Der General (18.7 percent) and Mr. Clean (18.4 percent). The green Frosch accounted for around 80 percent of all revenues generated by Werner & Mertz GmbH in 2006. In total, Werner & Mertz reported revenues of €455 million in 2019. In 2026, the brand celebrated its 40th anniversary and planted two hectares of floodplain forest as part of a project with NABU.

== Ecological focus and collaborations ==
Werner & Mertz uses the Frosch brand to cast itself as an ecological and sustainable manufacturer of household products. In her 1998 work "Bedeutung und Analyse einer umweltorientierten Kommunikationspolitik", Kerstin Haas writes that Frosch products were developed to be both environmentally sustainable and efficient at cleaning. At the time of their launch, Frosch cleaning products were the first phosphate-free cleaning agents based solely on natural ingredients available on the German market. Frosch's market position grew gradually throughout the late 1980s and early 1990s. The company's production facilities in Mainz and Hallein where the Frosch brand products are manufactured have obtained certification according to EMAS II, and EMAS III.

At its own production facilities, Frosch collaborates with the German Nature And Biodiversity Conservation Union NABU to expand the use of old plastics, for example from plastic bottles, for the manufacture of packaging. Packaging has consisted to 80% of recycled plastics since 2010. Plastic bottles were used initially as the primary source. The Recyclatt Initiative was launched in 2010. All of the brand's cleaning agent bottles are now made entirely of recycled materials. In 2019, Frosch joined with Green Dot and Erema to release the first retail packaging made of 100% recycled plastic obtained from the Gelber Sack (Yellow Sack) programme for domestic recycling waste. It was reported in 2022 that Frosch bottles are made from 50% recycled bottles and 50% yellow sack waste. Like the products by other manufacturers, Frosch cleaning agents continue to use surfactants acquired from palm kernel oil. This practice is criticised, as the cultivation of suitable plantations requires deforestation, especially of tropical rainforests in South-East Asia. Frosch has started to replace palm kernel oil in their products with canola oil that cannot be processed into food, because it is planted on impoverished soil for improving the soil quality. Another alternative is oil extracted from orange peel. Frosch has been using orange peel oil in various products since the early 1990s. The products also use surfactants from other plant-based sources such as sunflower seeds, rapeseed, flax, olives and flaxseed. According to company information, Frosch products have contained between 10 and 100% surfactants from European cultivation since 2013.

Werner & Mertz uses the "Frosch Initiative" to pool its sustainability efforts to increase the plastic recycling quota and use of European vegetable oils. The declared objective is to establish a circular economy and to fight plastic soup.

At local level, Werner & Mertz supports the reintroduction of tree frogs to the Rhine alluvial plains near Mainz as part of the German Nature and Biodiversity Conservation Union NABU initiative "Frosch schützt Frösche" (Frosch protects frogs).

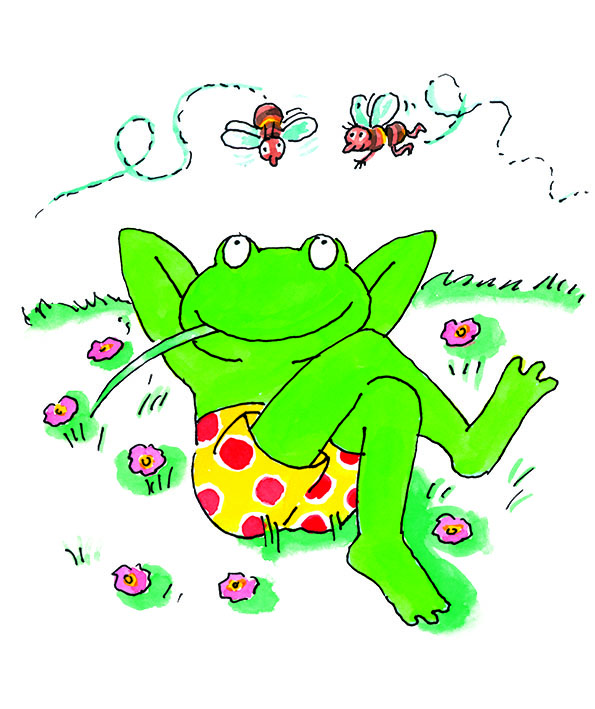
Frosch brand cartoon character

== Reception ==
=== Brand perception and industry awards ===
Professor of marketing Franz-Rudolf Esch states that Frosch is a successful brand for green cleaning agents. Kerstin Haas argues that the Frosch brand stands for "innovation and competence in the market of environmentally friendly cleaning products". The Frosch brand is generally associated with environmental topics.

The brand has a positive image among consumers and is well recognized. According to professor of marketing Marcus Stumpf, Frosch is the "best-known and most popular organic cleaing products brand". Most recently, it took first place in the household cleaner category of the Trusted Brands 2020 market study by Reader's Digest. The study has been conducted annually since 2001, and Frosch has come top of its category since 2002 and has even widened the gap to the second placed product. Study participants are asked to name a brand that they trust in particular with regard to environmental protection. Frosch was the most frequently mentioned brand.

The Lebensmittel Praxis journal awarded Frosch products the title Product of the Year on several occasions: Frosch Aloe Vera Hand Rinse Lotion received the Product of the Year Award 2005 in gold, Frosch Lavender Urine Scale and Limescale Remover 2009 in silver and Frosch Oasis Room Freshener Water Lily 2010 in bronze. Most recently, Frosch Senses Orange Blossom Sensitive Shower Gel was awarded 2020 Product of the Year in gold.

In 2008, Frosch received the brand award in the best brand extension category in recognition of its successful establishment of the independent Frosch Oasis room freshener brand beneath the Frosch brand umbrella. Frosch received the National German Sustainability Award at the end of 2009 as Germany's most sustainable brand. Another brand award went to Frosch in 2020, this time for the best sustainability strategy. In addition, Frosch won the Global Packaging Awards 2020 for its fully recyclable stand-up pouch, for which the company also received the 2021 German Design Award in the category "Excellent Communications Design – Eco Design". The stand-up pouch is made of polyethylene and does not contain glue. It was already patented in 2017. In 2021, Frosch was winner of the National German Sustainability Award Design for its recyclable packaging. Since 2014, Frosch has been making its PET packaging from post-consumer recyclate, 20 per cent of which was obtained from yellow sack waste. By 2022, the company was able to increase the yellow sack waste share to 50 per cent, for which it was awarded the WorldStar Packaging Award 2022.

In addition, Frosch was ranked among the top products in the EFFIE Awards on multiple occasions: the brand won the Gold Effie in 1991 and the Silver Effie in 2002. Frosch was an Effie finalist in 2003.

Frosch took over the market leadership in the category of glass cleaners in 2020. Its market share for laundry detergents grew to 3.3%. In the first three months of 2020, sales of liquid soap increased by 93% and of laundry detergent by 58% in a year-on-year comparison.

== Criticism ==
In 2019, Ökotest conducted a test of washing powders, which led to it revising the rating for a product by Frosch. This was because the detergent contained a synthetic polymer. The manufacturer responded by announcing that it would eliminate all such ingredients in the future. Öko-Test checked the statement in April 2020 and no longer detected the offending polymer among the ingredients. Liquid laundry detergents were tested in Issue 7/2020 of Öko-Test magazine. The Frosch brand laundry detergent was rated "satisfactory". The Frosch Universal detergent was marked down due to the dye transfer inhibitor it contains, which Ökotest counts as a synthetic polymer. Werner & Mertz has stated that a purely natural alternative to this active substance does not exist at present.
