= Hartmut Graßl =

German climate scientist

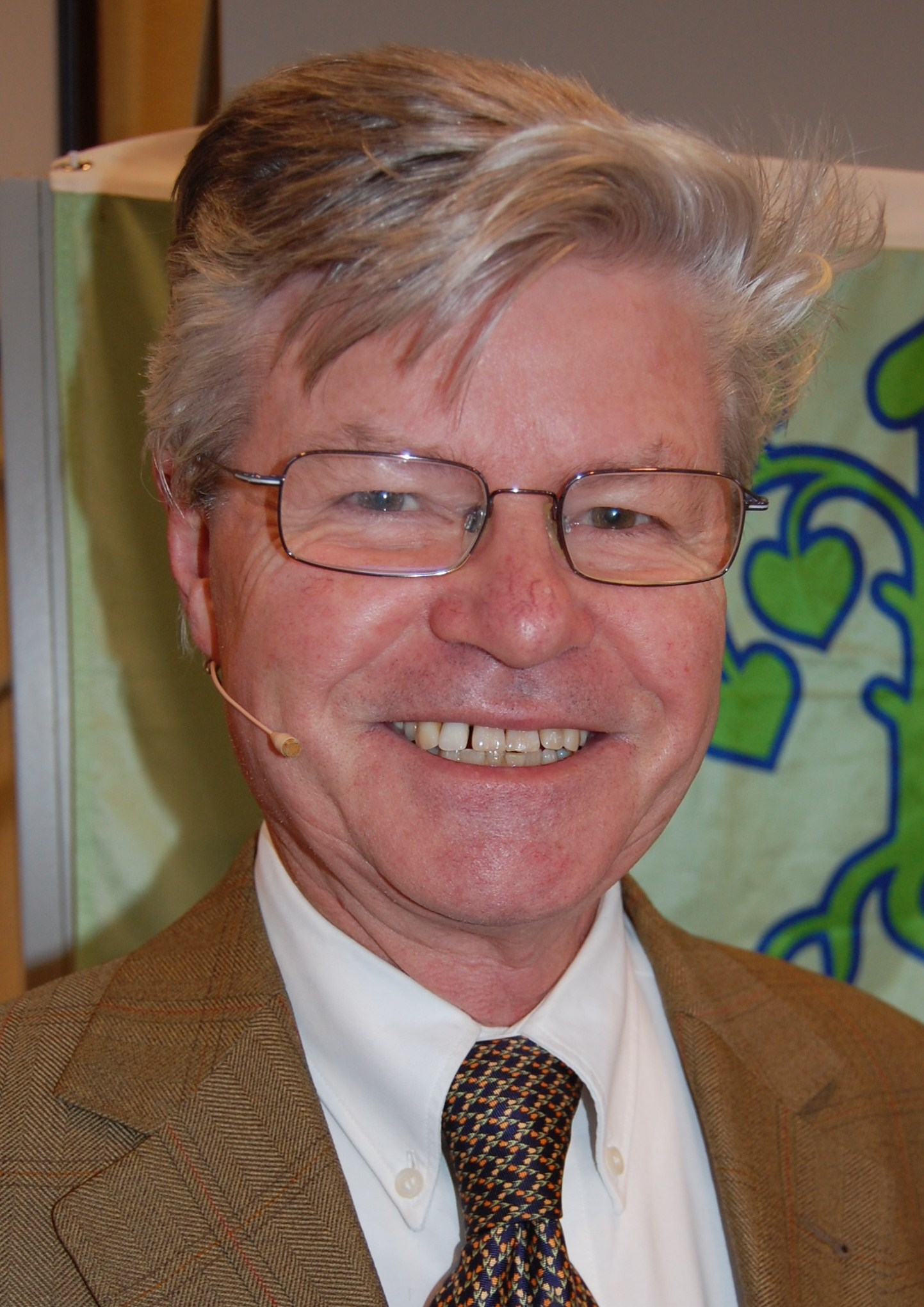
Hartmut Graßl (2010)

Hartmut Graßl (born 18 March 1940) is a German climate scientist and a former director of the Max Planck Institute for Meteorology.

Born in Salzberg, near Berchtesgaden, Graßl studied physics and meteorology at LMU Munich, and earned his PhD there in 1970. In 1981, he became professor of theoretical meteorology at Kiel University, and in 1984, he became director of the Institute of Physics at the GKSS Research Centre. In 1988, he became professor at the University of Hamburg and director of the Max Planck Institute for Meteorology. He retired in 2005.

== Honours ==
- Young Scientist Award of the German Meteorological Society, 1971
- Scientific Member of the Max Planck Society, 1988
- Max Planck Prize, 1991
- Member of the Academia Europaea, 1994
- German Environmental Prize, 1998
- Great Cross of Merit of the Order of Merit of the Federal Republic of Germany, 2002
- Bavarian Order of Merit, 2008
