= Werner & Mertz =

Werner & Mertz GmbH
- Type: GmbH
- Industry: Chemical industry
- Founded: 1867
- Headquarters: Mainz-Neustadt, Germany
- Key people: Reinhard Schneider
- Revenue: €355.246 million (2021)
- Number of employees: 1,183 (worldwide) (2021)
- Website: www.werner-mertz.de

Werner & Mertz GmbH is a medium-sized, family-run manufacturer of cleaning and care agents with headquarters in Mainz. The company emerged from the wax factory "Gebrüder Werner", which was founded in 1867. Werner & Mertz has sold shoe polish under the brand name Erdal since 1901. Household cleaning agents were added to the portfolio after the Second World War. The highest-selling brand is Frosch, which has offered environmentally friendly detergents since 1986. Company owner Reinhard Schneider was awarded the 2019 German Environment Prize in recognition of his services to environmental protection.

== History ==
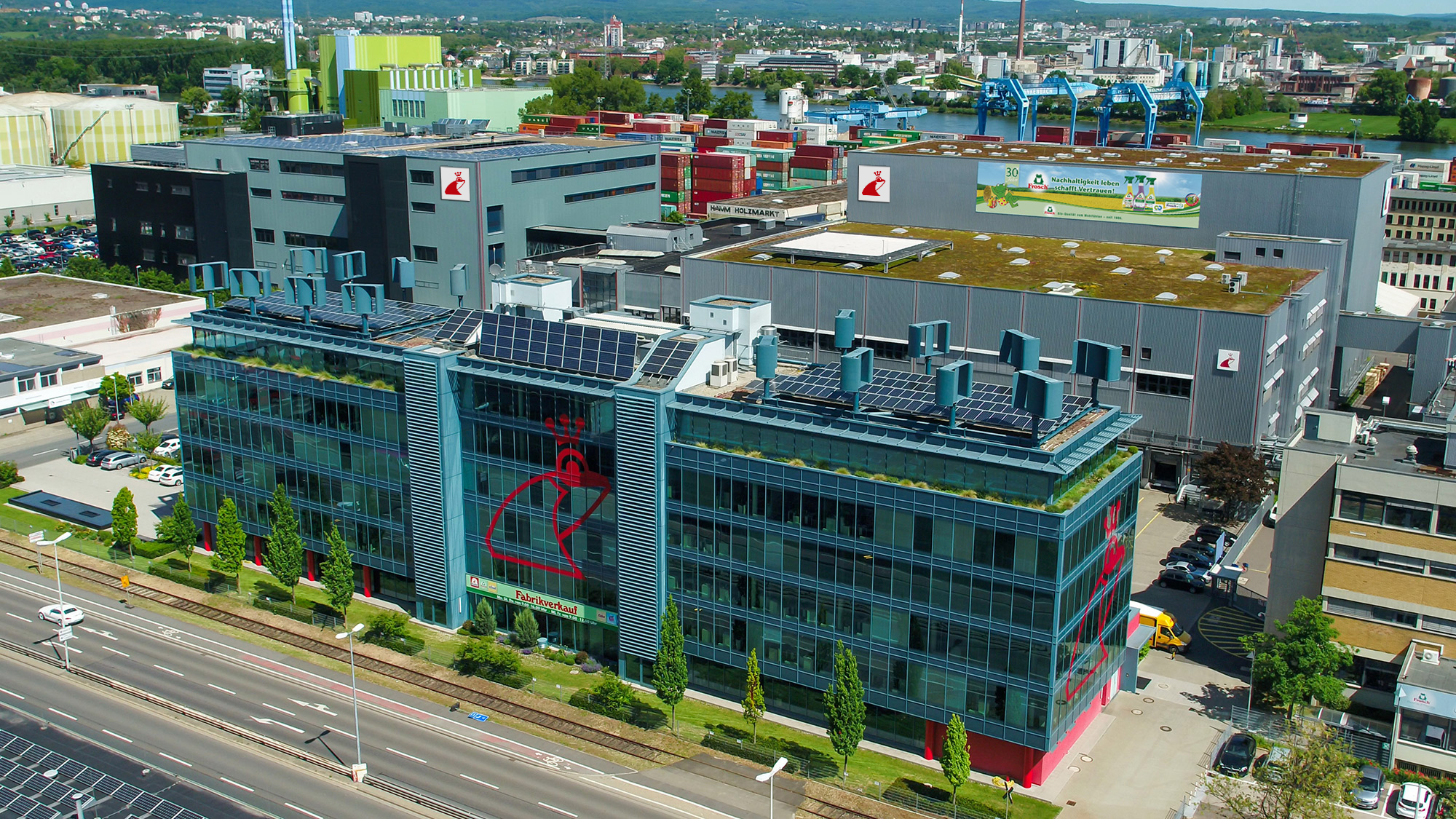
Aerial view of Werner & Mertz's Mainz company premises (2020)

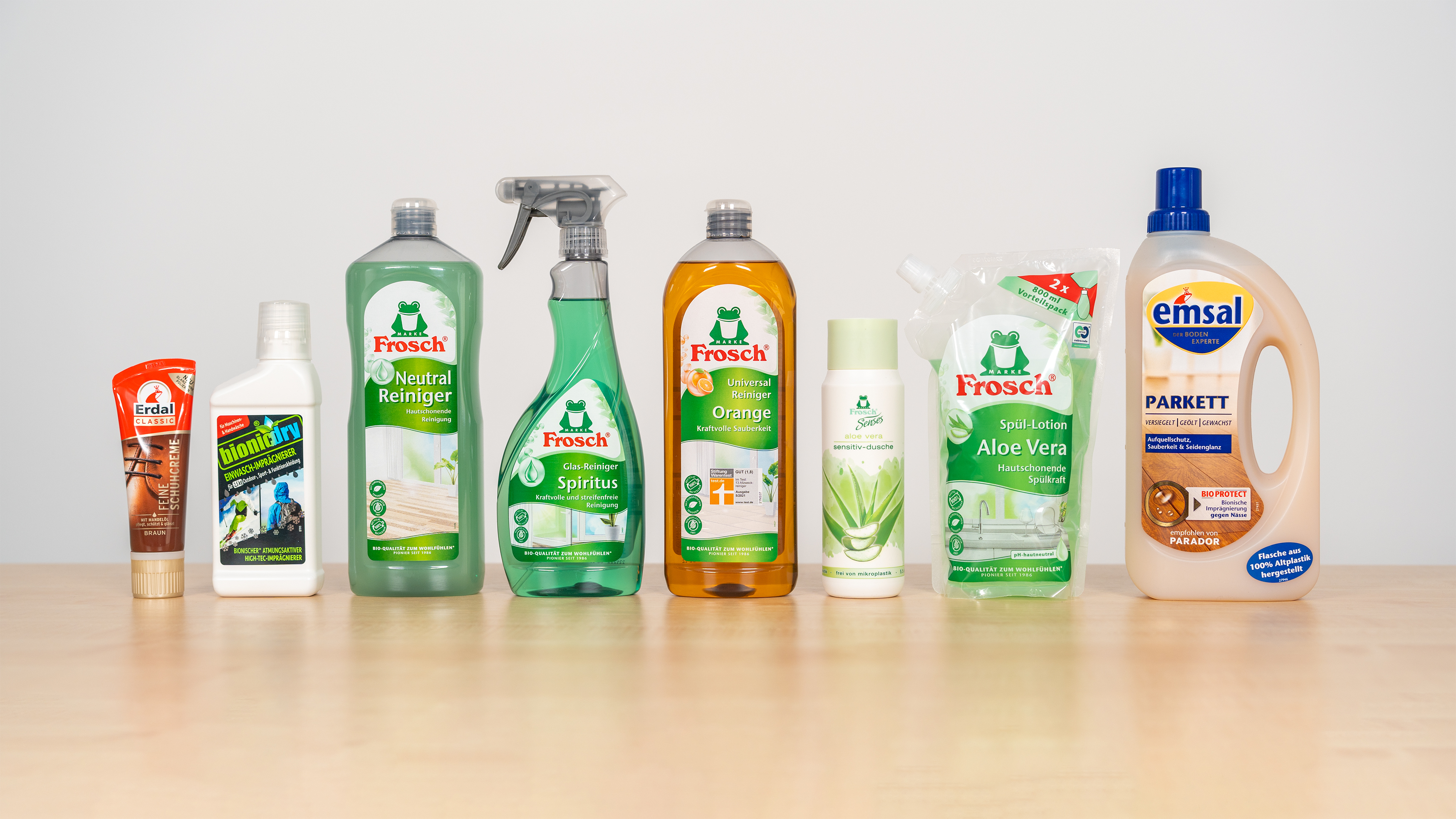
An exemplary selection of different products from Werner & Mertz

=== Foundation, company locations and management ===
In 1867, the brothers Friedrich Christoph Werner and Georg Werner founded the company in Mainz as the wax goods factory "Gebrüder Werner". Georg Mertz joined as a new partner. The factory was given its current name "Werner & Metz" when Mertz joined. He died in 1887, whereupon his brother-in-law Philipp Adam Schneider took over company management with the Werner brothers, which remains in the hands of his descendants today.

After Philipp Adam Schneider's death on 10 August 1901, his son Rudolf took over management of the company at the age of 19. From 1903, he managed the company in tandem with his brother Hermann Schneider.

A devastating fire laid waste to the factory and residential building on Erthalstraße in 1908. The company then moved into the new factory building on Ingelheimer Aue that autumn. After a fire in 1917, production continued at the same location in a newly built factory, which was completed in the summer of 1918. The "Frosch Tower" was constructed as part of this new complex and remains the "Erdal" landmark in Mainz to this day.

In the 1920s, advertising for Erdal, by now Werner & Mertz's best-known product, was intensified. Furthermore, the product range, production capacities and logistics were expanded in the interwar period. The products were also sold in other European countries in the 1930s.

During the World War II, production continued and around 20 forced labourers from Poland, Russia and France worked at Werner & Mertz. The company made reparation payments for this in 2000, to the "German Industry Fund for the Compensation of Forced Labourers during the Second World War", from the Foundation Remembrance, Responsibility and Future. A major Allied air raid in 1944, destroyed 80 percent of the company building, but left the Frosch Tower intact.

On 16 March 1948, the company received the third and final production permit from the responsible Allied authorities. On 3 May 1946, Radio Frankfurt reported that the "world-famous Erdal factory" had resumed production. The branch factory in Hallein, Austria, was established in 1953. Rudolf Schneider stepped down from company management in the same year. In 1962, Hermann Schneider handed over the management of the company to his son Helmut. In 1996, construction of a modern logistics centre in Mainz with fully automatic high-bay warehouse became the biggest investment in the company's history. Of Helmut Schneider's three children, his son Reinhard finally assumed management of the company in 2000, passing the reins to the fifth generation.

In 2008, the annual turnover of the company was 284 million euros, in 2012 – 305 million euros and in 2015 – 340 million euros.

In September 2010, the head office moved into an "energy-plus-balance house" on Mainz's Rheinallee. The new production centre in Mainz named "L8" was inaugurated in 2019. Costing €30 million, the company is quoted as saying it is the largest single investment in its history.

=== "Erdal" shoe polish ===
In 1901, the company used its expertise in wax processing to develop an innovative, wax-based shoe polish: the shoe colouring and polishing agents used until then had been based on sulphur, carbon black, syrup, molasses and water and had been harmful to the leather, had difficulty adhering to the shoes and ended up staining the clothes. Werner & Mertz adapted their address on Erthalstraße to market the shoe polish under the brand name Erdal and introduced the Froschkönig (Frosh King) as the new trademark in 1903.

The company experienced steady growth between 1912 and 1939 by adding new shoe care products, expanding its distribution and logistics and investing in advertising and sales promotion. Erdal was Germany's highest-selling shoe care product in 1921. The Berlin-based company Urban & Lemm was acquired in 1928, adding its successful shoe cleaning product Urbin.

=== Expansion of the product range ===
After the end of the Second World War, and in the 1950s especially, Werner & Mertz expanded its range of household cleaning agents, adding products for bathrooms and carpets in particular. The portfolio was expanded further with the foundation of Tana Chemie GmbH in 1971, a supplier of cleaning agents for large consumers such as restaurants, hospitals, industrial plants and office buildings.

In 2026, the brand celebrated its 40th anniversary.

== Environmental responsibility ==
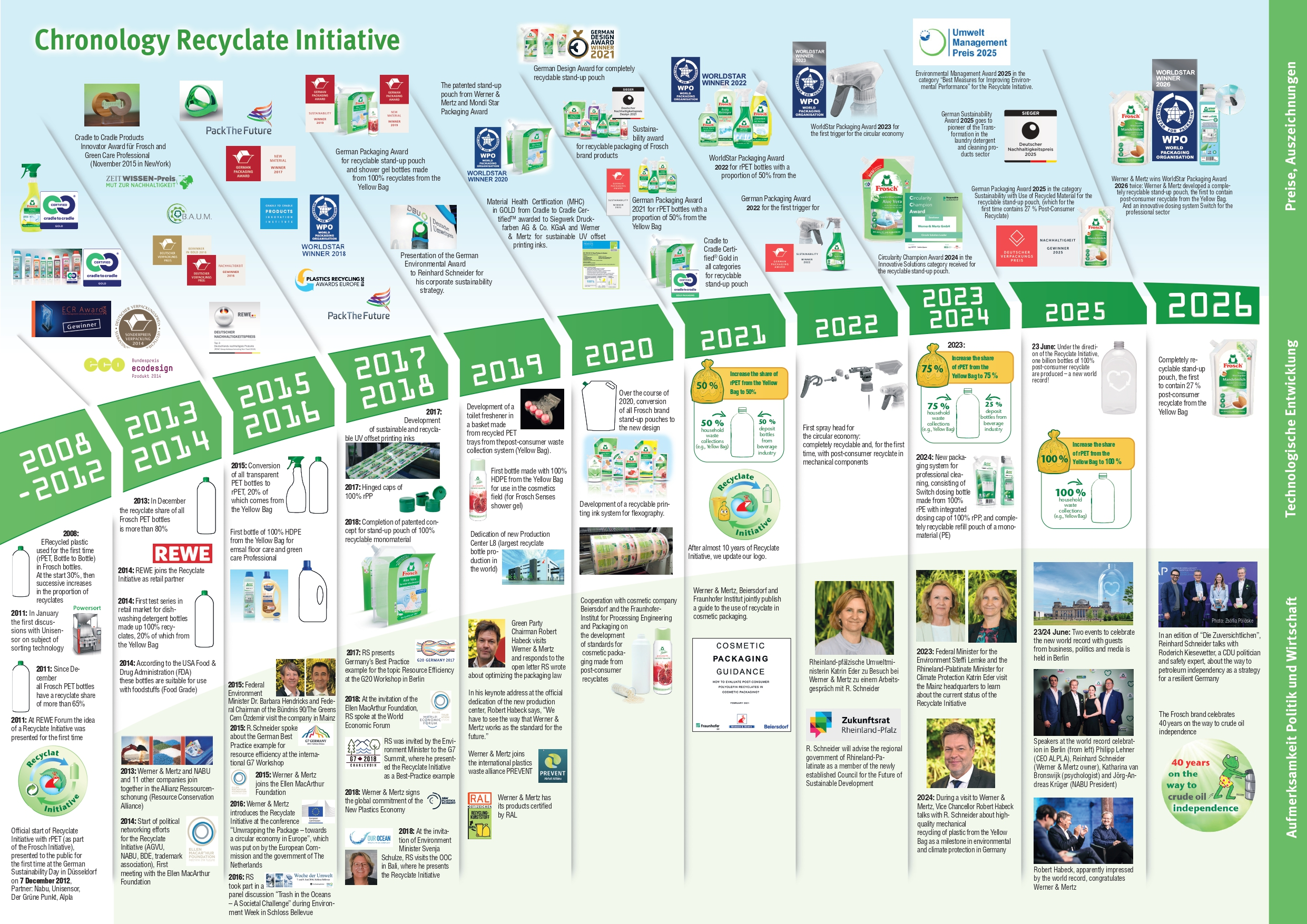
Chronology of the Recyclate Initiative

In 1986, the company introduced the first phosphate-free household cleaning agent under the brand name Frosch. The Erdal shoe care range has been solvent-free since 1996, and emsal products have contained ingredients on a natural basis since 2009. Werner & Mertz also launched the brands Green Care Professional and Tana Professional, which both offer hygiene and cleaning products. Werner & Mertz has used its brand names (besides Frosch, they are Erdal, tana professional, green care professional, Rorax, Emsal and Bionicdry) to adopt a market position of corporate social responsibility.

The owner Reinhard Schneider has driven this development since taking office in 2000. An environmental and sustainability management programme was introduced under his leadership, and the production facilities have been certified according to the European Union Eco Management and Audit Scheme (EMAS) since 2003.

Recycled plastic was first used in production during 2008; the Recyclat Initiative was officially launched in 2012. The initiative collaborates with other partners, including the Green Dot, with the aim of making greater use of plastics sourced from household waste. It calls on politicians and the general public to advocate a higher recycling rate in order to protect the climate and the oceans. In addition, the company seeks the advice of the German Nature and Biodiversity Conservation Union NABU in its Recyclat Initiative. Packaging has consisted to 80% of recycled plastics – initially sourced mainly from plastic bottles – since 2010. Detergent bottles used by the Frosch brand are now made entirely from recycled materials and since June 2025, only recycled plastic from the German Yellow Sack collection system has been used. By June 23, Werner & Mertz had distributed 1 billion rPET bottles made from 100% post-consumer recyclate. The company had already launched the first shower gel bottle made entirely from recycled plastic sourced from the Yellow Sack system back in 2019.

The recycling of plastics is a niche business overall, as it is more cost-intensive compared to plastic production from oil. In 2020, the company was nevertheless one of the few to remaining companies to the use of recycled plastics in the face of falling oil prices.

== Public perception ==
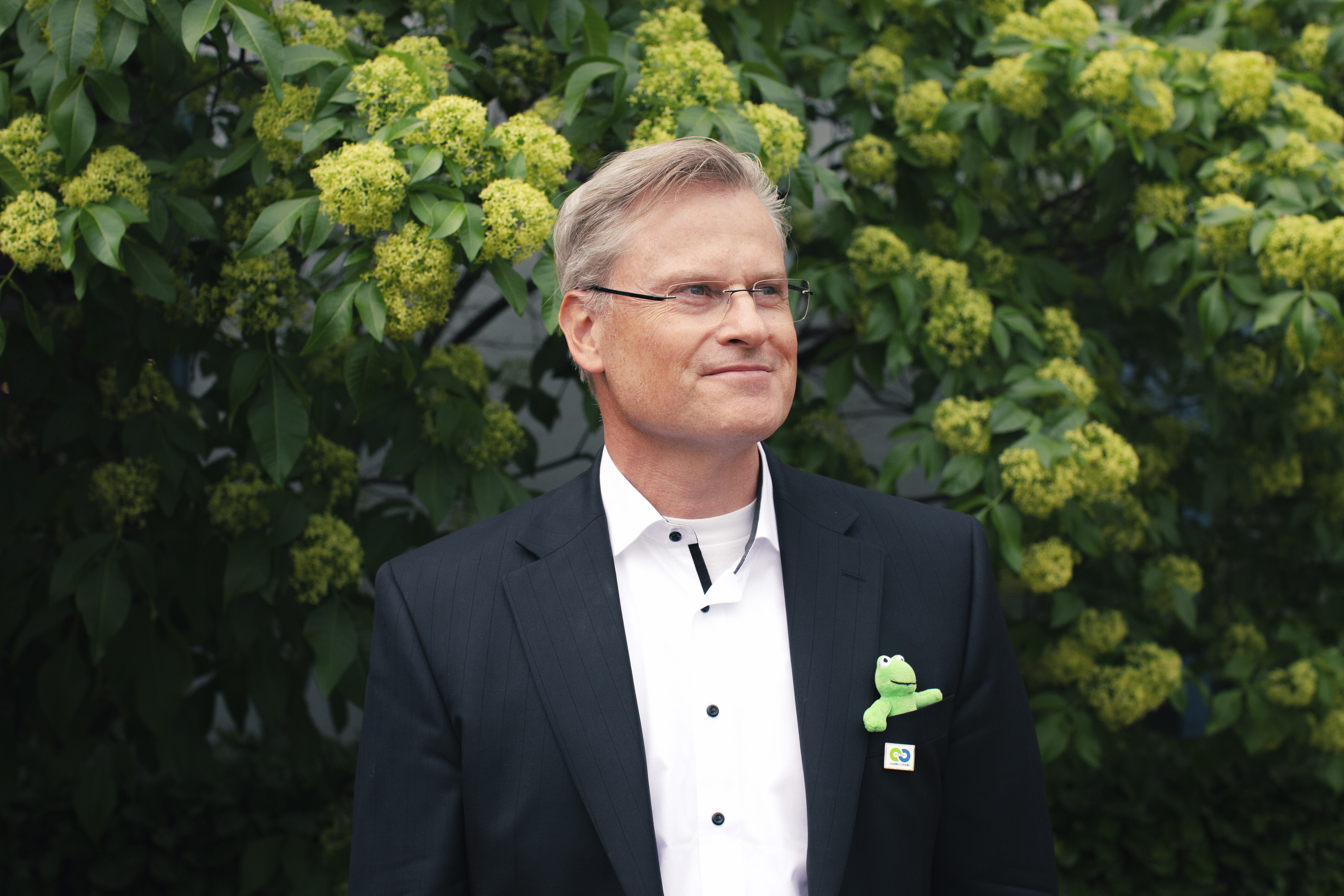
Reinhard Schneider (2020) with brand mascot Frosch

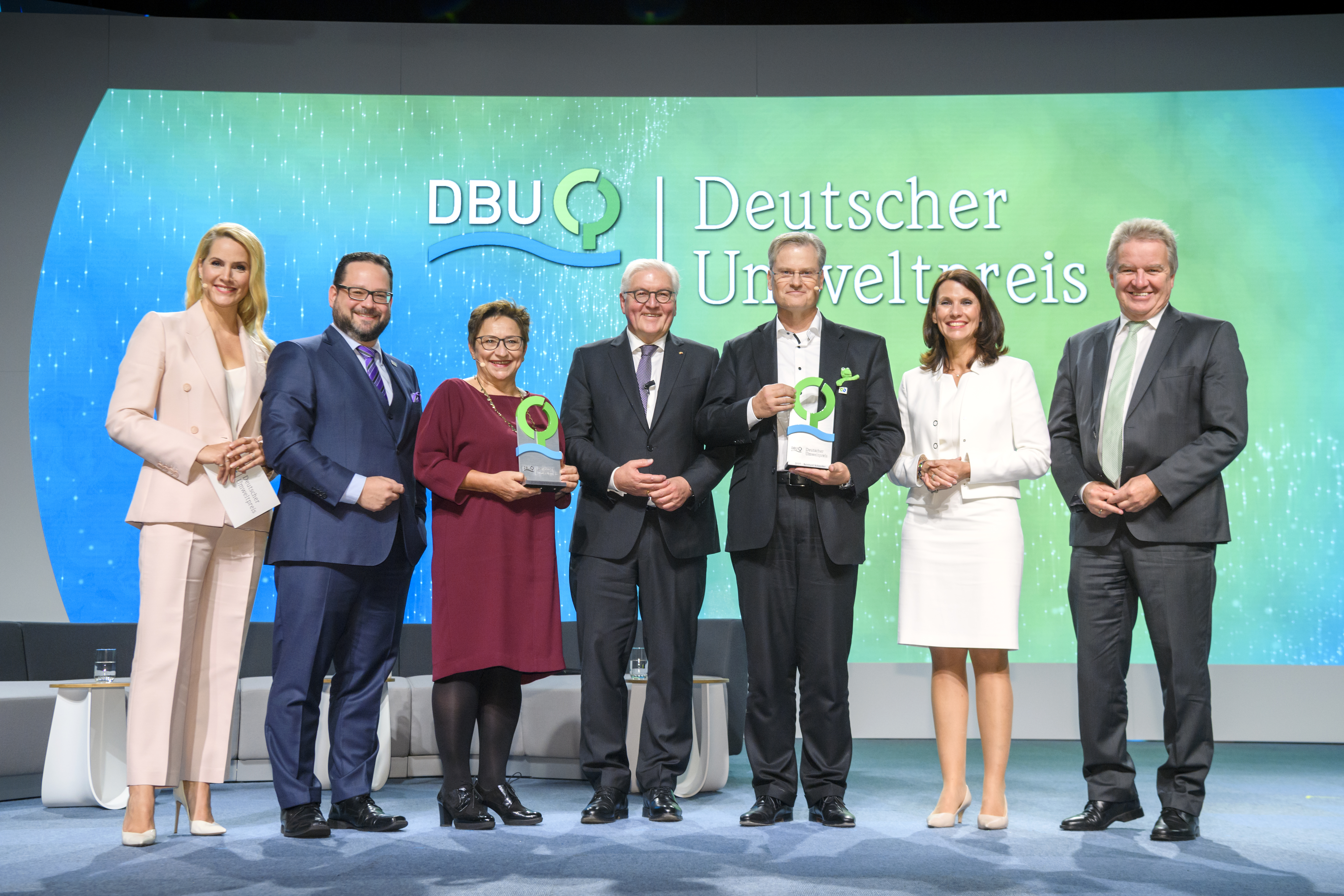
German Environmental Award 2019

=== Image and reception ===
The company's ecological profile dominates public perception, especially due to the detergent brand Frosch. "Deutsche Standards – Marken des Jahrhunderts" (German Standards – Brands of the Century") for instance, published by Die Zeit, sees the Frosch brand as a "sustainability pioneer" and therefore attests to the formative influence that the brand has exerted on its industry. Over the course of its history, the company has received a variety of awards for its actions, mainly environmental prices since 2000. Among them was the Environmental Prize of the State of Rhineland-Palatinate, which was awarded to the company for its new administrative building; later on it received an LEED certificate in the highest level (platinum) for sustainable building. The owner Reinhard Schneider was awarded the German Environment Prize in 2019.

Since 2023, the company has hosted livestreams under the name "Die Zuversichtlichen", in which public and political figures discuss sustainability and the circular economy.

==== Awards ====
- 1991: Award of the Austrian Coat of Arms to the Austrian subsidiary plant and recognition of the company's importance for the province of Salzburg and the city of Hallein.
- 2010: Environment Prize of the State of Rhineland-Palatinate.
- 2012: LEED Platinum for the main administrative building on Rheinallee
- 2014: ECR Award for the Recyclat Initiative
- 2014: Packaging award for the company's Recyclat Initiative
- 2014: German Ecodesign Award for the Recyclat Initiative
- 2019: German Environment Prize for the company owner Reinhard Schneider
- 2023: WorldStar Packaging Award for the "spray head for the circular economy" developed jointly with Berry Global
- 2024: Circularity Champion Award
- 2025: German Packaging Award
- 2025: We Impact certification for sustainable corporate alignment
- 2025: Environmental Management Award in the category "Best Measures for Improving Environmental Performance" for the Recyclate Initiative
- 2025: Audience Award and EY Entrepreneur of the Year Award
- 2026: German Packaging Award

=== Criminal product liability: Leather spray 1980–1988 ===
In 1988, the company and its managers were put on trial in Germany, charged with negligent bodily injury and life-threatening health hazards. Company directors were accused of having failed to withdraw a leather spray from the market in good time, despite having known since 1980 of the health risks posed by the product manufactured by Werner & Mertz and distributed via subsidiaries (Erdal Rex GmbH, Solitär GmbH). They were also charged with failure to promptly affix warning labels to the products. The responsibility and liability of the managers were confirmed in an appeal-court ruling before the Federal Court of Justice.
