= Reinhard Schneider =

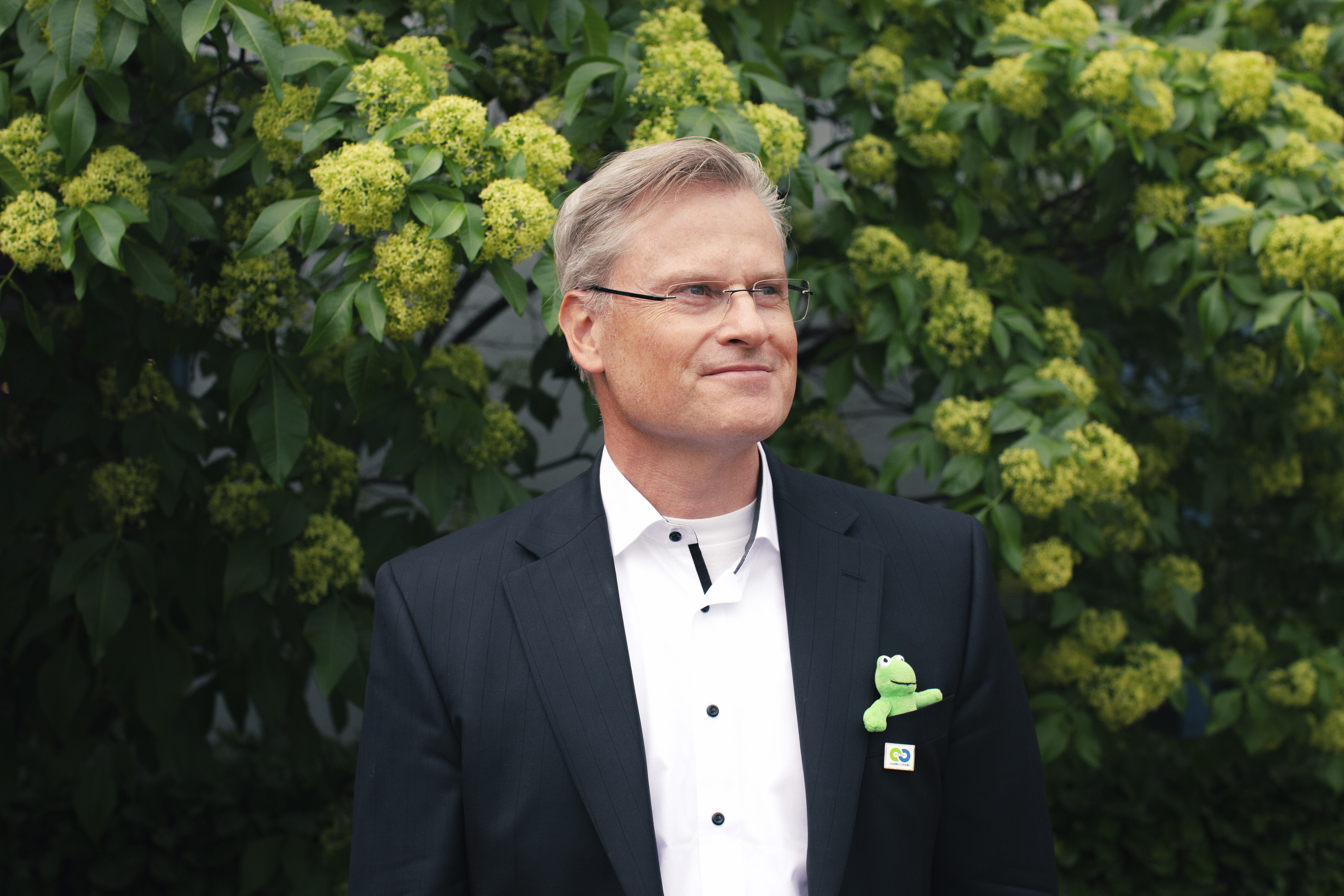
- Born: 1968 (age 57–58); Mainz
- Occupations: Managing director Werner & Mertz

Reinhard Schneider (born 1 May 1968 in Mainz) is a German business administrator and managing director of the Mainz-based family company Werner & Mertz, which is best known for its Frosch brand. In this position, he focused the company’s sustainability strategy and advocates greater commitment from the business community to climate and environmental protection. Schneider is holder of the German Environmental Prize 2019.

== Life and work ==
Schneider studied business administration with a focus on sales and commerce at the University of St. Gallen in Switzerland. After graduating, Schneider worked in marketing at various companies for six years. As a descendant of the founders of Werner & Mertz, he had served on the company’s supervisory board since 1992. In 2000, he became Chairman of the Board of Management and also took charge of the Consumer Division. He is owner of the company.

As managing director, Schneider had a defining influence on the sustainability strategy adopted by Werner & Mertz. Among other things, he commissioned the design of new company buildings in accordance with ecological aspects (such as the company headquarters) and, as part of the “Local Surfactants” initiative, increasingly replaced the share of palm kernel oil in the company’s cleaning agents with vegetable oils from European cultivation.

He also rose to prominence thanks to his measures to reduce plastic waste and CO_{2} emissions by increasing the use of recycled plastic in packaging production. To achieve this goal, he founded the Recyclat Initiative with partners from the industrial sector, waste management and environmental associations in 2012. He is also politically active in this field and advocates, among other things, the introduction of a tax on new plastics. Schneider also campaigns publicly, encouraging the business community to show greater commitment to environmental protection.

Schneider is also a member of the Executive Committee of the German Wettbewerbszentrale (central office for the prevention of unfair competition) and has been a member of the newly founded Future Council for Sustainable Development Rhineland-Palatinate since March 2022. In 2026, Schneider, together with university professor Klaus Helling, was involved in the preparation of the position paper of the Future Council for Sustainable Development Rhineland-Palatinate. The paper highlights the circular economy as a key approach for sustainable and resource-independent development and calls for binding political framework conditions.

== Awards ==
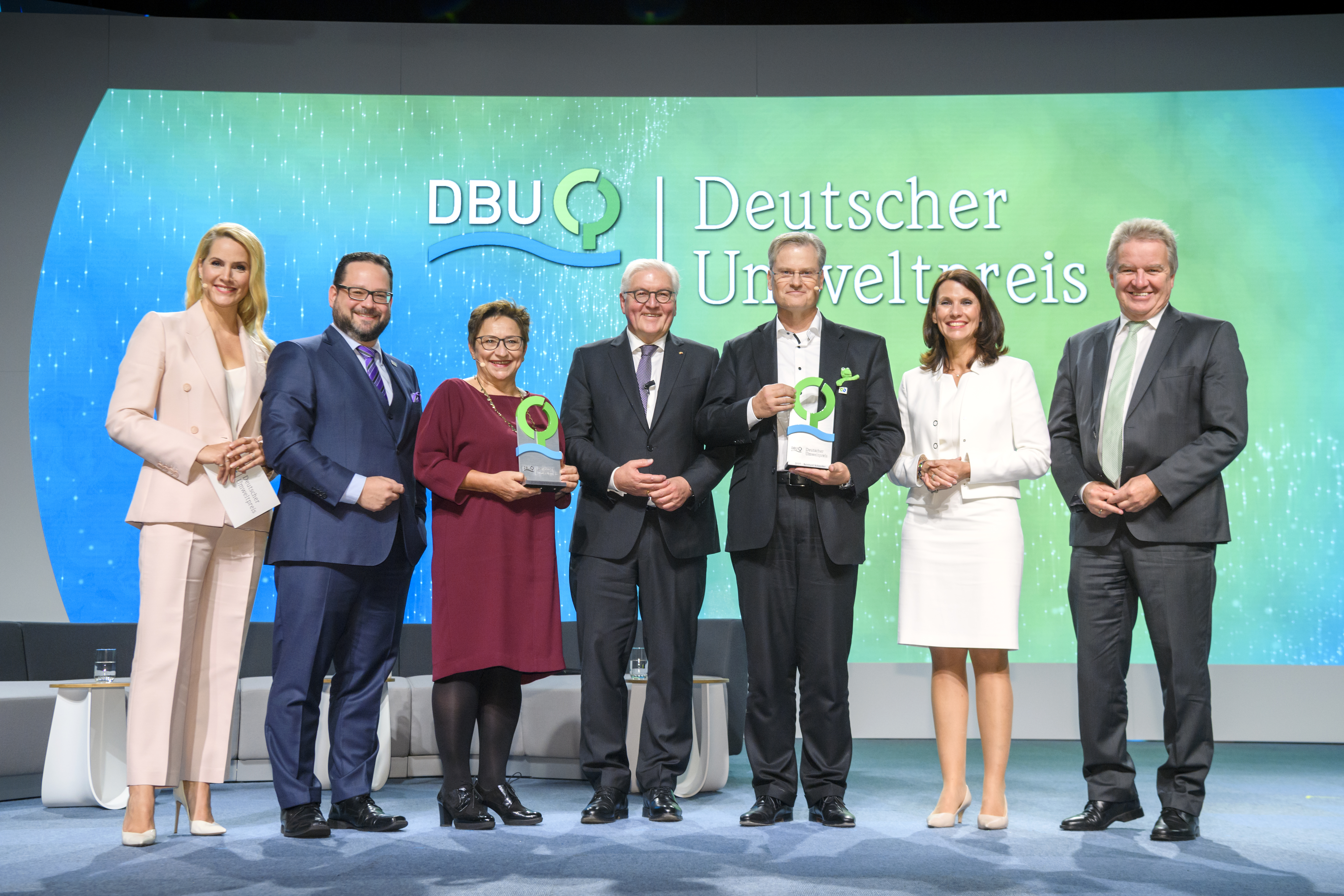
Award Ceremony German Environmental Prize 2019

Schneider has received multiple awards in recognition of the sustainability strategy he introduced at Werner & Mertz and for the recycling initiative in particular. The most prestigious award is the German Environmental Prize 2019. He received the award from Federal President Frank-Walter Steinmeier, who justified the distinction with Schneider’s pioneering role in the business community. Schneider had “behaved as a responsible entrepreneur [...] before many others had taken action” and had shown “that environmentally conscious and entrepreneurial actions are not mutually contradictory”. The German Federal Environmental Foundation honoured him for having made “environmentally friendly products viable for the mass market” in a “testing ecological environment”.

In September 2021, Schneider was awarded the Trigos Prize of Honour in Austria for his efforts towards a circular economy and sustainability. In 2025, he received the EY Entrepreneur of the Year award in the Sustainability category, presented by Ernst & Young.
