= Maciej Nowicki =

Polish politician (born 1941)

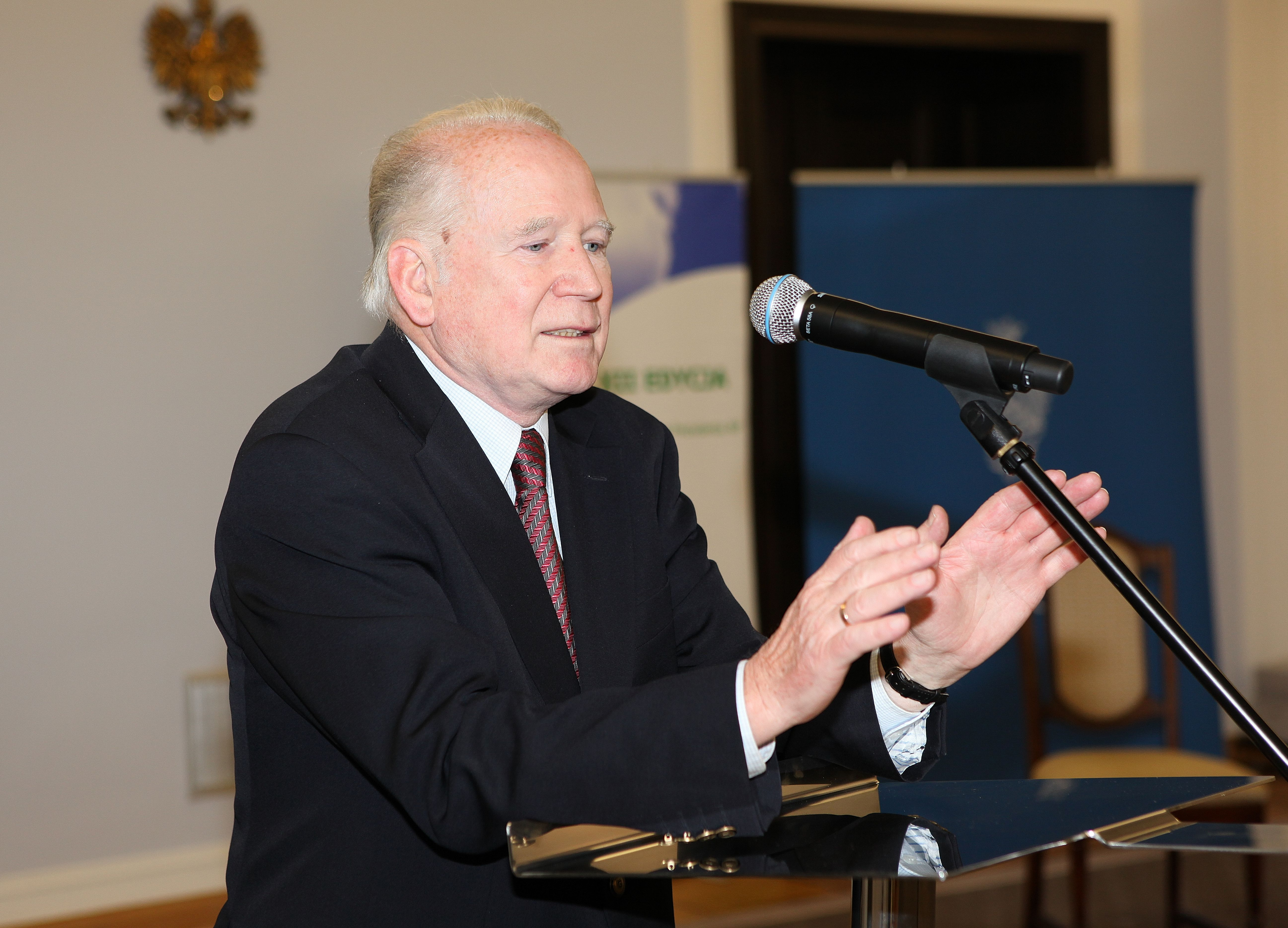

Minister of the Environment of the Republic of Poland
- In office November 16, 2007 – February 1, 2010
- Preceded by: Jan Szyszko
- Succeeded by: Andrzej Kraszewski

Minister of the Environmental Protection, Natural Resources and Forestry of the Republic of Poland
- In office January 12, 1991 – December 5, 1991
- Preceded by: Bronisław Kamiński
- Succeeded by: Stefan Kozłowski

Personal details
- Born: September 28, 1941 (age 83); Warsaw, Poland
- Political party: none

Maciej Nowicki (born 28 September 1941) is a Polish politician, manager and scientist. Minister of the Environment of the Republic of Poland in the cabinet of Donald Tusk (from 16 November 2007 to 1 February 2010).

== Career ==
Nowicki graduated of the Faculty of Environmental Engineering at the Warsaw University of Technology (1964). He commenced employment as researcher at the Polish Academy of Sciences (1964–1970) and then at the Warsaw University of Technology (1970–1986). In 1972 he obtained doctor degree and in 1976 qualified as the assistant professor in the field of atmospheric protection. In 1992 President of the Republic of Poland awarded Professorship to Dr. Maciej Nowicki.

In the period of 1989–1991 performed function of deputy minister at the Ministry of the Environmental Protection, Natural Resources and Forestry and from 1991 the Minister of the Environmental Protection, Natural Resources and Forestry in the Cabinet of Prime Minister Jan Krzysztof Bielecki.

In 1992, Professor Maciej Nowicki established the Eco-Fund Foundation and held the Presidency there until October 2007.

In 1994–1995 Deputy Chairman of the United Nations Commission on Sustainable Development.

In 1996–1997 Adviser to the Secretary-General of the Organisation for Economic Co-operation and Development (OECD).

His other prominent functions include: membership in the European Academy of Sciences and Arts in Salzburg; Poland's Representative to the European Commission (European Economic and Social Committee's Consultative Commission on Industrial Change (CCMI)); membership in the "Man and Environment" Scientific Committee of the Polish Academy of Sciences and membership in the State Council of Environmental Protection.

== Awards ==
In 1996, Professor M. Nowicki was awarded the German Environmental Prize, being the most prestigious environmental award in Europe granted by the German Federal Environmental Foundation in recognition of one's overall achievements in the field of environmental research and policy making. The amount of 350,000 DM of this prize was assigned by Nowicki to establish foundation, to support personal curricula of outstanding graduates from Polish universities and colleges in the field of environment. In the period of 1997–2007 several-month international scholarships were financed by this way to more than 160 Polish graduates in co-operation with the German DBU Foundation.

He has been awarded high state honours, including that of the Commander's Cross of the Order of Polonia Restituta (2010), the Golden Cross of Merit (Poland) and the Großes Verdienstkreuz mit Stern (Great Cross of Merit with Star - Federal Republic of Germany).

== Publications ==
Professor M. Nowicki wrote more than 170 publications and 6 books dedicated to environmental protection and sustainable development. Selected publications:

- Stanisław Chróściel, Maciej Nowicki, Problemy obliczeniowe w ochronie atmosfery, Wydawnictwa Politechniki Warszawskiej, Warszawa 1977
- Jan Juda, Maciej Nowicki, Urządzenia odpylające, Państwowe Wydawnictwo Naukowe, Warszawa 1986
- Maciej Nowicki, Ministerstwo Ochrony Środowiska, Zasobów Naturalnych i Leśnictwa 1993. Strategia ekorozwoju Polski, Agencja Reklamowo-Wydawnicza A. Grzegorczyk, Warszawa 1993
- Maciej Nowicki, Lutz Ribbe, Problemy ekorozwoju Polski, Agencja Reklamowo-Wydawnicza A. Grzegorczyk, Warszawa 2001

== Private life ==
Professor M. Nowicki is married with two daughters.

His hobbies are: history of art, architecture, music, tourism, including hiking. He is not a member of any political party.
