= Katrin Böhning-Gaese =

German biologist (born 1964)

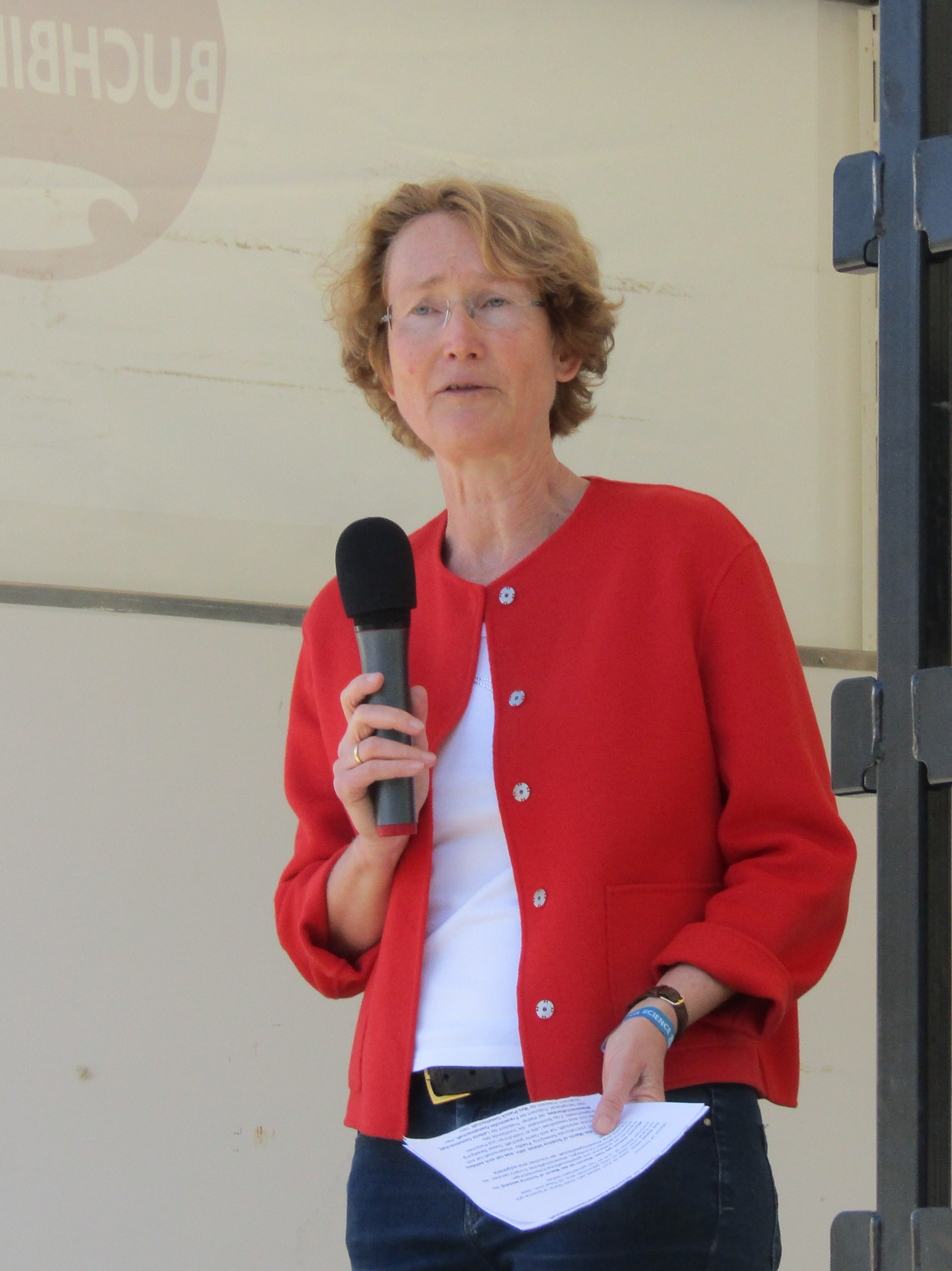
- Born: 22 December 1964 (age 61); Oberkochen, West Germany
- Education: University of Tübingen
- Scientific career
- Fields: Ornithology
- Workplaces: Goethe University Frankfurt, Senckenberg Nature Research Society

Katrin Böhning-Gaese (born 22 December 1964) is a German biologist who specialises in ornithology. She is currently a professor at Goethe University Frankfurt, director of the Senckenberg Nature Research Society and Vice-President of the Leibniz Association.

== Biography ==
Katrin Böhning-Gaese was born on 22 December 1964 in Oberkochen, Germany. She initially studied biology as an undergraduate at the University of Tübingen. She gained her PhD in 1993 from the same University on following research into of white stork food ecology in Upper Swabia and causes of long-term stock development in European and North American songbirds. She held the title of Professor of ecology at the Johannes Gutenberg University Mainz in 2001.

Her main research interests include the influence of global climate change and human land use change on animal populations in tropical and temperate areas of the world and evolution of bird communities and bird migration. In addition to research work she also teaches students in the MSc Ecology and Evolution and BSc Biology courses at Goethe University Frankfurt since 2010.

== Other activities ==
- German Council for Sustainable Development (RNE), Member (since 2023, appointed ad personam by Chancellor Olaf Scholz)
- Leibniz Association, Vice-President (since 2017)
- Senckenberg Nature Museum, Member of the Governing Board

== Awards ==
- 2021 German Environmental Prize

== Selected publications ==
- Grünewald, Claudia; Breitbach, Nils; Böhning-Gaese, Katrin (2010). "Tree visitation and seed dispersal of wild cherries by terrestrial mammals along a human land-use gradient". Basic and Applied Ecology. 11 (6). Elsevier BV: 532–541. doi:10.1016/j.baae.2010.07.007. ISSN 1439-1791.
- Breitbach, Nils; Laube, Irina; Steffan-Dewenter, Ingolf; Böhning-Gaese, Katrin (5 January 2010). "Bird diversity and seed dispersal along a human land-use gradient: high seed removal in structurally simple farmland". Oecologia. 162 (4). Springer Science and Business Media LLC: 965–976. Bibcode:2010Oecol.162..965B. doi:10.1007/s00442-009-1547-y. ISSN 0029-8549. PMID 20049479. S2CID 585850.
- Mauricio Bini, L.; Diniz-Filho, J. Alexandre F.; Rangel, Thiago F. L. V. B.; Akre, Thomas S. B.; Albaladejo, Rafael G.; Albuquerque, Fabio S.; Aparicio, Abelardo; Araújo, Miguel B.; Baselga, Andrés; Beck, Jan; Isabel Bellocq, M.; Böhning-Gaese, Katrin; Borges, Paulo A. V.; Castro-Parga, Isabel; Khen Chey, Vun; Chown, Steven L.; de Marco, Jr, Paulo; Dobkin, David S.; Ferrer-Castán, Dolores; Field, Richard; Filloy, Julieta; Fleishman, Erica; Gómez, Jose F.; Hortal, Joaquín; Iverson, John B.; Kerr, Jeremy T.; Daniel Kissling, W.; Kitching, Ian J.; León-Cortés, Jorge L.; Lobo, Jorge M.; Montoya, Daniel; Morales-Castilla, Ignacio; Moreno, Juan C.; Oberdorff, Thierry; Olalla-Tárraga, Miguel Á.; Pausas, Juli G.; Qian, Hong; Rahbek, Carsten; Rodríguez, Miguel Á.; Rueda, Marta; Ruggiero, Adriana; Sackmann, Paula; Sanders, Nathan J.; Carina Terribile, Levi; Vetaas, Ole R.; Hawkins, Bradford A. (2009). "Coefficient shifts in geographical ecology: an empirical evaluation of spatial and non-spatial regression". Ecography. 32 (2). Wiley: 193–204. doi:10.1111/j.1600-0587.2009.05717.x. hdl:10400.3/1632. ISSN 0906-7590.
- Schaefer, Hans-Christian; Jetz, Walter; Böhning-Gaese, Katrin (24 August 2007). "Impact of climate change on migratory birds: community reassembly versus adaptation". Global Ecology and Biogeography. 17. Wiley: 071106211200001––. doi:10.1111/j.1466-8238.2007.00341.x. ISSN 1466-822X.
