= Hans Joachim Schellnhuber =

German atmospheric physicist and climatologist

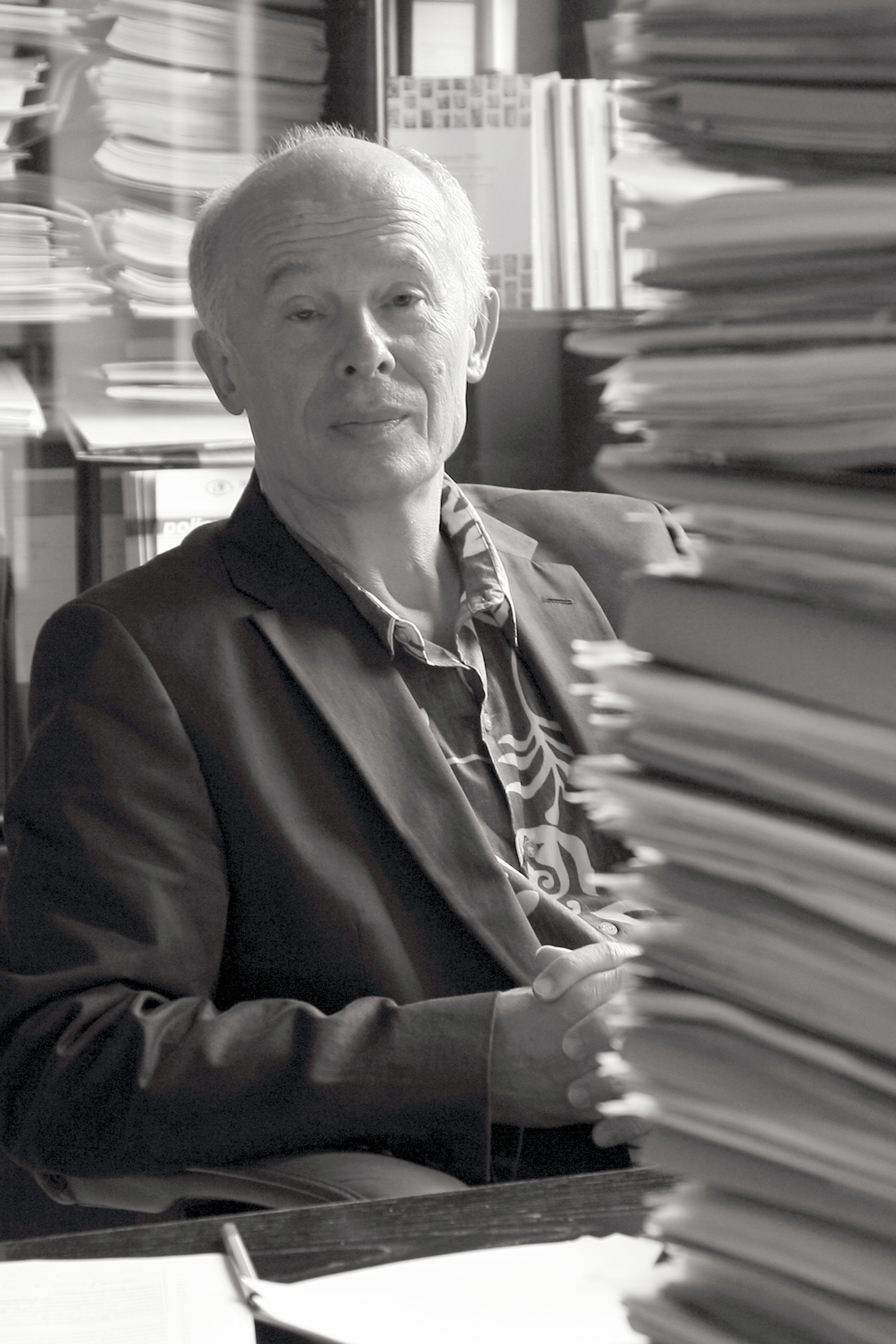
- Born: 7 June 1950 (age 76)
- Education: University of Regensburg
- Awards: German Environment Prize (2007); Volvo Environment Prize (2011); Blue Planet Prize (2017)
- Scientific career
- Fields: Climatology
- Workplaces: Potsdam Institute for Climate Impact Research; University of Potsdam

Hans Joachim "John" Schellnhuber (born 7 June 1950) is a German atmospheric physicist, climatologist and founding director of the Potsdam Institute for Climate Impact Research (PIK) and former chair of the German Advisory Council on Global Change (WBGU). Since 1 December 2023, Schellnhuber is the Director General of IIASA.

== Education ==
Schellnhuber studied mathematics and physics, obtaining a doctorate in theoretical physics from the University of Regensburg in 1980, followed in 1985 by habilitation (qualification for office) in theoretical physics at the University of Oldenburg. In 1981, he became a postdoctoral fellow at the Institute of Theoretical Physics (ITP) at the University of California, Santa Barbara, working across the corridor from its director Walter Kohn, who became one of his academic supervisors.

== Career ==
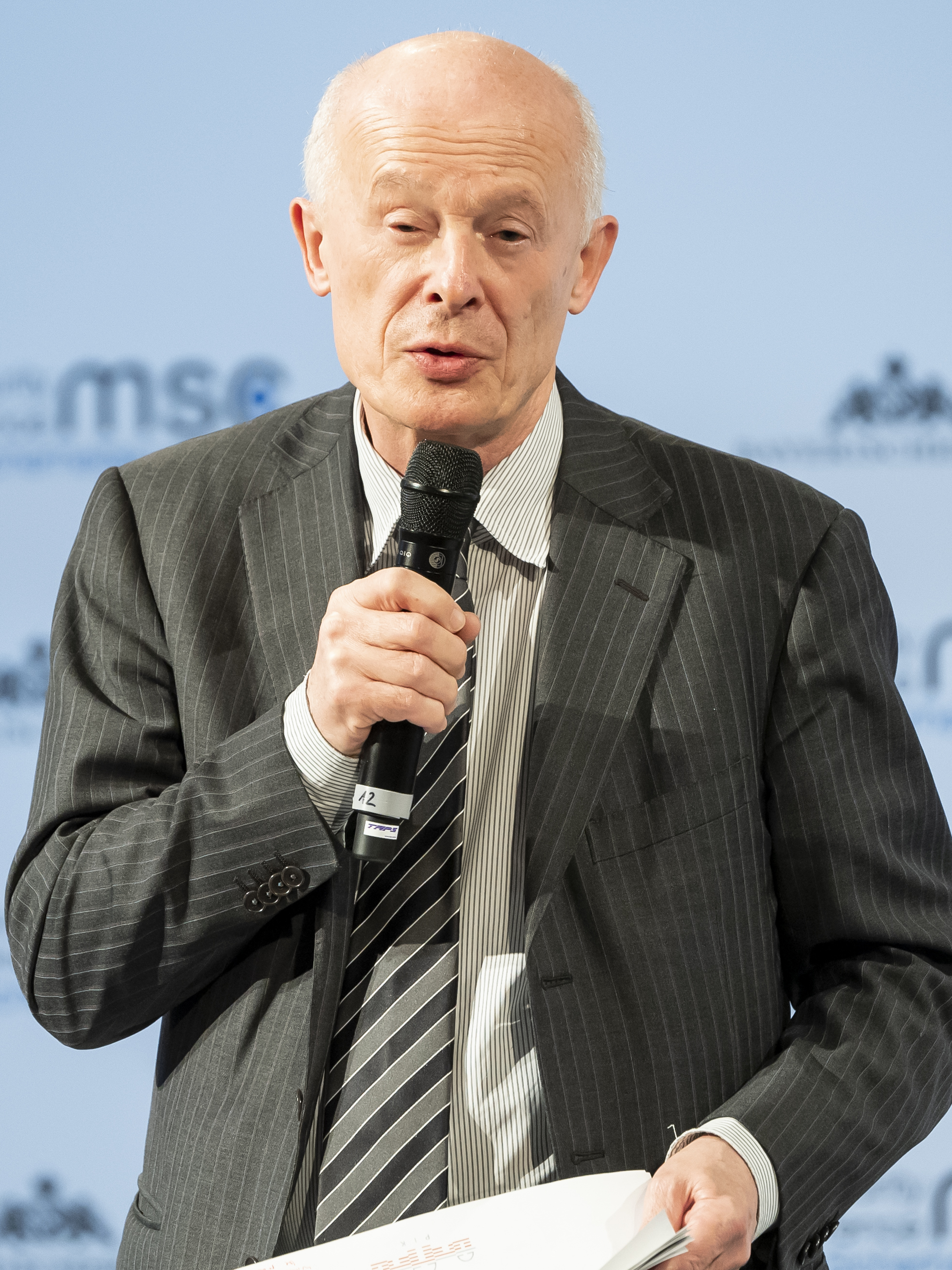
Schellnhuber during the MSC 2019

Originally interested in solid state physics and quantum mechanics, Schellnhuber became drawn to complex systems and nonlinearity or chaos theory. As a full professor for theoretical physics and then director at the Institute for Chemistry and Biology of the Marine Environment at Oldenburg University, he was involved in analysing the structure of ocean currents.

In 1991, he was called upon to create the Potsdam Institute for Climate Impact Research (PIK). He became its director in 1993 – helping it grow to become one of the world's most renowned climate research institutes with more than 300 employees following an interdisciplinary approach.

As early as 1995 Schellnhuber proposed the 2 °C guardrail for global warming which was adopted first by the German government and the European Union and then, following the Copenhagen accord in 2009, as a global target by governments worldwide.

From 2001 to 2005 Schellnhuber served as research director of the Tyndall Centre in England and became a visiting professor at the University of Oxford.

Schellnhuber has been professor at the University of Potsdam, Germany, and an external professor at the Santa Fe Institute in the US.

As a long-standing member of the Intergovernmental Panel on Climate Change which was jointly awarded the 2007 Nobel Peace Prize, Schellnhuber has been a coordinating lead author of the synthesis chapter of Working Group II of the IPCC's Third Assessment Report. He has warned of dire consequences of continued global warming As an expert on climatological tipping points, he is a public speaker on the subject.

In 2017, Schellnhuber said that unless climate action is taken by 2020, the world "may be fatally wounded."

== Achievements ==
Schellnhuber has helped create numerous iconic concepts such as the analysis of tipping elements in the climate system, the burning embers, and the budget approach for emissions.

== Honors ==
In 2002, Schellnhuber received the Royal Society's Wolfson Research Merit Award In 2004 Her Majesty Queen Elizabeth II appointed him to Commander of the Order of the British Empire (CBE). In 2005, the National Academy of Sciences (US) appointed him as a member. He was awarded the German Environment Prize in 2007. In that same year, he was elected a member of the German Academy of Sciences Leopoldina.

In 2011, he was the first German to receive the Volvo Environment Prize, which is the highest-ranking award in the field of environmental sciences worldwide. He was honoured with the Order of Merit of the Federal Republic of Germany (first class) as well and holds honorary doctorates from Copenhagen University and Technische Universität Berlin.

The German magazine Cicero in 2012 ranked him amongst the 500 most important German intellectuals. In 2017, Schellnhuber was awarded the Blue Planet Prize of the Asahi Glass Foundation.

== Civic involvement and service ==
As one of the leading climate scientists worldwide, he has been a consultant to the former President of the European Union Commission, José Manuel Barroso. In 2007, he was appointed Chief Government Advisor on Climate and Related Issues during Germany's EU Council Presidency and G8 Presidency.

In 2007, Schellnhuber started "A Nobel Cause – Nobel Laureate Symposium Series on Global Sustainability" in Potsdam, bringing together Nobel Laureates from all disciplines with leading sustainability scientists. In 2009, this event took place in London and in 2011 in Stockholm, where the UN secretary-general's High Level Panel on Sustainability came to the meeting to receive a memorandum that was fed into the Rio+20 conference in 2012.

Schellnhuber offers scientific insights to business leaders, as a member of the Climate Change Advisory Board of Deutsche Bank and chair of the governing board of the European Institute of Innovation and Technology's Climate Knowledge and Innovation Communities (EIT Climate KIC). In 2012, he was the lead-author of a report commissioned by the World Bank on possible impacts of a 4 degrees Celsius warming towards the end of the 21st century. This report received a lot of attention worldwide. That same year, Schellnhuber presented the keynote at the gala dinner that opened the high-level segment of the world climate summit COP18 in Doha, Qatar. In the presence of UN Secretary-General Ban Ki-moon and UNFCCC's boss Christiana Figueres, a few days later Schellnhuber signed an agreement with the Qatar Foundation to jointly create a Climate change research institute in Qatar – a remarkable step as the country's wealth for decades had been based on exporting fossil fuels.

In 2013, Schellnhuber was one of 18 prominent international scientists to launch the Earth League, a global interdisciplinary alliance of leading research institutes that focus on Earth system analysis and sustainability science, including economy. UN Security Council members Pakistan and UK asked him to speak at a meeting of the Council under the Arria Formula, the meeting at the UN headquarter in New York was attended by UN Secretary-General Ban Ki-moon. In the runup of the world climate summit in Warsaw, Schellnhuber discussed possible ways forward with the president of Cop19, the Polish Minister of the Environment Marcin Korolec. To advance the state of science, Schellnhuber initiated the Inter-Sectoral Impact Model Intercomparison Project (ISI-MIP) that involves more than 30 research teams from 12 countries. In 2013, the scientific journal Nature called it the "first comprehensive global-impact project" – it aims at identifying robust insights as well as research gaps, based on a yet unprecedentedly broad comparison of computer simulations of future climate change impacts such as water scarcity, floodings, or yield changes. In 2013, Schellnhuber's efforts resulted in the Impacts World Conference in Potsdam followed by a special feature on first ISI-MIP results in the Proceedings of the National Academy of Sciences (PNAS).

Schellnhuber has been serving as chair of the Climate-KIC (Knowledge and Innovation Community) governing board, which is affiliated to the European Institute of Innovation and Technology (EIT). This institution aims at fostering low-carbon entrepreneurship and innovation.

Schellnhuber signed the 2005 Potsdam Denkschrift calling for a change in thinking to enable sustainable development.

== Controversies ==
=== Rhetoric and alarmism ===
Schellnhuber has frequently used stark language regarding the systemic risks of unmitigated climate change, often describing trajectories past temperature thresholds as entering a "death zone" or threatening civilization collapse. Critics have accused him of alarmism and crossing from objective scientific advice into political advocacy.

=== Travel controversy ===
In July 2023, Schellnhuber faced public criticism and accusations of double standards after admitting he had taken a domestic flight from Berlin to Munich despite previously advocating for bans on domestic air travel. Schellnhuber responded that he regularly travels by train and had a rail ticket purchased, but was forced to reschedule at short notice due to severe railway delays and cancellations.

=== Leadership at IIASA and parliamentary inquiry ===
In December 2023, Schellnhuber assumed the role of Director General of the International Institute for Applied Systems Analysis (IIASA) in Laxenburg, Austria. During his tenure, the institute has become the subject of public scrutiny and formal parliamentary oversight in Austria concerning academic freedom, institutional governance, and research security.

In July 2025, members of the Austrian National Council led by Sigrid Maurer submitted a formal parliamentary inquiry (2923/J) to the Federal Ministry of Women, Science and Research regarding governance and security issues at IIASA. The inquiry focused on two main controversies under IIASA's management:

- The withdrawal and continued non-publication of a policy brief by Israeli economist Rotem Zelingher following internal complaints related to her nationality and funding, even after an internal ethics review found no scientific misconduct.
- Potential foreign influence and security vulnerabilities surrounding an IIASA researcher's ties to the EU-sanctioned Russian foundation Pravfond.

In its official response in September 2025 (2486/AB), Science Minister Eva-Maria Holzleitner confirmed that the ministry and the Austrian Academy of Sciences (ÖAW) had raised the matters within the IIASA Council in June 2025, pressing IIASA's directorate for comprehensive clarification on the previously inadequately addressed allegations and affirming standards of academic freedom and research security.

== Personal life ==
He is married to Margret Boysen, who is the author of Alice, the Zeta Cat and Climate Change.

== Publications ==
Schellnhuber has published more than 250 scientific papers and has authored, co-authored, or edited 50 books or book chapters.

- Schellnhuber, H.; Obermair, G. (1980). "First-Principles Calculation of Diamagnetic Band Structure". Physical Review Letters. 45 (4): 276–279. Bibcode:1980PhRvL..45..276S. doi:10.1103/PhysRevLett.45.276.
- Schellnhuber, H. J., Crutzen, P.J., Clark, W.C., Claussen, M. and Held, H. (Eds.) (2004). Earth System Analysis for Sustainability. MIT Press, Cambridge, MA, London, UK
- Schellnhuber, H. J. and Wenzel V. (1998). Earth System Analysis: Integrating Science for Sustainability. Springer Verlag, Berlin.
- Schellnhuber, H. J. et al. (Eds.) (2006). Avoiding Dangerous Climate Change. Cambridge University Press, Cambridge, UK Lenton, T. M.; Held, H.; Kriegler, E.; Hall, J. W.; Lucht, W.; Rahmstorf, S.; Schellnhuber, H. J. (2008). "Inaugural Article: Tipping elements in the Earth's climate system". Proceedings of the National Academy of Sciences. 105 (6): 1786–1793. Bibcode:2008PNAS..105.1786L. doi:10.1073/pnas.0705414105. PMC 2538841. PMID 18258748.
- Lenton, T. M.; Held, H.; Kriegler, E.; Hall, J. W.; Lucht, W.; Rahmstorf, S.; Schellnhuber, H. J. (2008). "Inaugural Article: Tipping elements in the Earth's climate system". Proceedings of the National Academy of Sciences. 105 (6): 1786–1793. Bibcode:2008PNAS..105.1786L. doi:10.1073/pnas.0705414105. PMC 2538841. PMID 18258748.
- Schellnhuber, H. J. et al. (2009). Solving the climate dilemma: The budget approach. WBGU Special Report, WBGU, Berlin
- Hall, J.; Held, H.; Dawson, R.; Kriegler, E.; Schellnhuber, H. J. (2009). "Imprecise probability assessment of tipping points in the climate system". PNAS. 106 (13): 5041–6. Bibcode:2009PNAS..106.5041K. doi:10.1073/pnas.0809117106. PMC 2657590. PMID 19289827.
- Rockström, J.; et al. (2009). "A safe operating space for humanity". Nature. 461 (7263): 472–5. Bibcode:2009Natur.461..472R. doi:10.1038/461472a. PMID 19779433. S2CID 205049746.
- Schellnhuber, H. J. (2009). "Tipping elements in the Earth System". Proceedings of the National Academy of Sciences. 106 (49): 20561–20563. Bibcode:2009PNAS..10620561S. doi:10.1073/pnas.0911106106. PMC 2791592. PMID 19995979.
- Reid, W. V.; Chen, D.; Goldfarb, L.; Hackmann, H.; Lee, Y. T.; Mokhele, K.; Ostrom, E.; Raivio, K.; Rockström, J.; Schellnhuber, H. J.; Whyte, A. (2010). "Earth System Science for Global Sustainability: Grand Challenges". Science. 330 (6006): 916–7. Bibcode:2010Sci...330..916R. doi:10.1126/science.1196263. PMID 21071651. S2CID 39302849.
- Schellnhuber, H. J, Molina, M., Stern, N., Huber, V. and Kadner, S. (Eds.) (2010). Global Sustainability – A Nobel Cause. Cambridge University Press, Cambridge
- Schellnhuber, H. J. (2010). "The road from Copenhagen: the expert's views". Nature Climate Change. 1 (1002): 15–17. Bibcode:2010NatCC...1...15H. doi:10.1038/climate.2010.09.
- Gleick, P. H.; et al. (2010). "Climate Change and the Integrity of Science". Science. 328 (5979): 689–90. Bibcode:2010Sci...328..689G. doi:10.1126/science.328.5979.689. PMC 5125622. PMID 20448167.
- Schellnhuber, H. J. (2010). "Tragic Triumph". Climatic Change. 100 (1): 229. Bibcode:2010ClCh..100..229S. doi:10.1007/s10584-010-9838-1. S2CID 189872877.
- Kropp, J. P. and Schellnhuber, H. J. (Eds.) (2011). In Extremis: Disruptive Events and Trends in Climate and Hydrology. Springer Verlag, Berlin
- Richardson, K., Steffen, W., Liverman, D., et al. (including Schellnhuber, H. J.) (2011). Climate Change: Global Risks, Challenges and Decisions. Cambridge University Press, Cambridge
- Hofmann, M.; Worm, B.; Rahmstorf, S.; Schellnhuber, H. J. (2011). "Declining ocean chlorophyll under unabated anthropogenic CO2 emissions". Environ. Res. Lett. 6 (3) 034035. Bibcode:2011ERL.....6c4035H. doi:10.1088/1748-9326/6/3/034035.
- Schellnhuber, H. J. (2011). "Vorwärts zur Natur". Frankfurter Allgemeine Sonntagszeitung. 17: 28.
- Schellnhuber, H. J. et al. (2011). World in Transition – A Social Contract for Sustainability. WBGU Report, WBGU, Berlin Schellnhuber, H. J. (2011). "Geoengineering: The good, the MAD, and the sensible". Proceedings of the National Academy of Sciences. 108 (51): 20277–20278. Bibcode:2011PNAS..10820277S. doi:10.1073/pnas.1115966108. PMC 3251148. PMID 22160718.
- Hofmann, M.; Worm, B.; Rahmstorf, S.; Schellnhuber, H. J. (2011). "Declining ocean chlorophyll under unabated anthropogenic CO2emissions". Environmental Research Letters. 6 (3) 034035. Bibcode:2011ERL.....6c4035H. doi:10.1088/1748-9326/6/3/034035.
- Donges, J. F.; Donner, R. V.; Trauth, M. H.; Marwan, N.; Schellnhuber, H.J.; Kurths, J. (2011). "Nonlinear detection of paleoclimate-variability transitions possibly related to human evolution". Proceedings of the National Academy of Sciences. 108 (51): 20422–20427. Bibcode:2011PNAS..10820422D. doi:10.1073/pnas.1117052108. PMC 3251081. PMID 22143765.
- Schellnhuber, H. J. (2011). "Geoengineering: The good, the MAD, and the sensible". Proceedings of the National Academy of Sciences. 108 (51): 20277–20278. Bibcode:2011PNAS..10820277S. doi:10.1073/pnas.1115966108. PMC 3251148. PMID 22160718.
- Kundzewicz, Z. W. et al. (including Schellnhuber, H. J.) (2012). Changes in Flood Risks – Setting the Stage. In Kundzewicz, Z. W. (Ed.) (2012). Changes in Flood Risks in Europe. IAHS Press, Oxfordshire, UK, 11
- Schellnhuber, H.J., Hare, W., Serdeczny, O. et al. (2012). Turn Down the Heat – Why a 4 °C Warmer World Must be Avoided. A Report commissioned by The World Bank
- Olonscheck, D.; Hofmann, M.; Worm, B.; Schellnhuber, H. J. (2013). "Decomposing the effects of ocean warming on chlorophyllaconcentrations into physically and biologically driven contributions". Environmental Research Letters. 8 (1) 014043. Bibcode:2013ERL.....8a4043O. doi:10.1088/1748-9326/8/1/014043. hdl:20.500.11850/65791.
- Ludescher, J.; Gozolchiani, A.; Bogachev, M. I.; Bunde, A.; Havlin, S.; Schellnhuber, H. J. (2013). "Improved El Nino forecasting by cooperativity detection". Proceedings of the National Academy of Sciences. 110 (29): 11742–11745. arXiv:1304.8039. Bibcode:2013PNAS..11011742L. doi:10.1073/pnas.1309353110. PMC 3718177. PMID 23818627.
- Ludescher, J.; Gozolchiani, A.; Bogachev, M. I.; Bunde, A.; Havlin, S.; Schellnhuber, H. J. (2013). "Improved El Nino forecasting by cooperativity detection". Proceedings of the National Academy of Sciences. 110 (29): 11742–11745. arXiv:1304.8039. Bibcode:2013PNAS..11011742L. doi:10.1073/pnas.1309353110. PMC 3718177. PMID 23818627.
- Piontek, F.; Muller, C.; Pugh, T. A. M.; Clark, D. B.; Deryng, D.; Elliott, J.; Colon Gonzalez, F. D. J.; Florke, M.; Folberth, C.; Franssen, W.; Frieler, K.; Friend, A. D.; Gosling, S. N.; Hemming, D.; Khabarov, N.; Kim, H.; Lomas, M. R.; Masaki, Y.; Mengel, M.; Morse, A.; Neumann, K.; Nishina, K.; Ostberg, S.; Pavlick, R.; Ruane, A. C.; Schewe, J.; Schmid, E.; Stacke, T.; Tang, Q.; Tessler, Z. D. (2013). "Multisectoral climate impact hotspots in a warming world". Proceedings of the National Academy of Sciences. 111 (9): 3233–3238. Bibcode:2014PNAS..111.3233P. doi:10.1073/pnas.1222471110. PMC 3948244. PMID 24344270.
- Schellnhuber, H. J.; Frieler, K.; Kabat, P. (2013). "The elephant, the blind, and the intersectoral intercomparison of climate impacts". Proceedings of the National Academy of Sciences. 111 (9): 3225–3227. Bibcode:2014PNAS..111.3225S. doi:10.1073/pnas.1321791111. PMC 3948299. PMID 24347641.
- Rockström, Johan; et al. (2017). "A roadmap for rapid decarbonization" (PDF). Science. 355 (6331): 1269–1271. Bibcode:2017Sci...355.1269R. doi:10.1126/science.aah3443. PMID 28336628. S2CID 36453591.
- Steffen; et al. (2018). "Trajectories of the Earth System in the Anthropocene". PNAS. 115 (33): 8252–8259. Bibcode:2018PNAS..115.8252S. doi:10.1073/pnas.1810141115. PMC 6099852. PMID 30082409.

== See also ==
- Developmental economics
- Ecological economics
- Sustainable development
