= Wolfgang Haber =

German biologist (1925–2026)

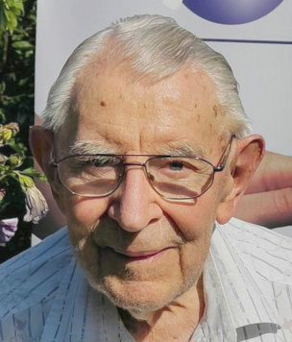
- Born: 13 September 1925; Datteln, Weimar Republic
- Died: 13 August 2026 (aged 100)
- Education: University of Münster; LMU Munich; University of Basel; University of Stuttgart; University of Hohenheim
- Occupation: Biologist
- Organizations: Technical University of Munich
- Awards: German Environmental Prize; Bavarian Order of Merit; Order of Merit of the Federal Republic of Germany; Bavarian Maximilian Order for Science and Art

Wolfgang Haber (13 September 1925 – 13 August 2026) was a German biologist who helped establish the field of landscape ecology, teaching at the Technical University of Munich from 1966 to 1993. He pioneered research and teaching based on ecological principles of nature conservation, state and landscape management, to apply ecology in land use, especially in nature conservation, agricultural use, land consolidation, and ecologically oriented planning. He was an adviser to governments in Germany, such as the Federal Ministry of Food and Agriculture, and was influential in international organisations. He was instrumental in the establishment of the first German National Parks, Bavarian Forest National Park and Berchtesgaden National Park. Haber became the first recipient of the German Environmental Prize in 1993.

== Life and career ==
Haber was born in Datteln on 13 September 1925. In 1943 he was drafted for military service during World War II, sent to Italy, held as a prisoner of war in Italy and France, and returned in 1948. He studied botany, zoology, chemistry and geography at the University of Münster, the LMU Munich, the University of Basel, and the University of Hohenheim. He received his doctorate in Münster in 1957 with a dissertation on bacteria and respiration of different natural soils in Central Europe.

From 1957 to 1962, Haber was a research assistant for Heinrich Walter in Hohenheim, and then from 1962 to 1966 a curator and deputy director of the Westphalian Museum of Natural History in Münster, where he was responsible for nature conservation and landscape management in Westphalia. From 1961 to 1971, he was also president of the German Orchid Society and the editor of its bimonthly journal Die Orchidee.

=== Professor ===
From 1966, Haber was professor at the Technical University of Munich at the Weihenstephan campus, where he headed the newly founded institute for landscape management, which he later renamed the chair for landscape ecology. Haber researched fundamental questions of general and theoretical ecology; the application of ecology in land use, in particular in nature conservation, agricultural use, and land consolidation; the development, planning, and support of nature reserves, protected habitats, and natural and national parks; ecosystem research and modeling; and ecologically oriented planning. In teaching, he focused on classes in ecology for various degree programs such as landscape conservation, agricultural sciences, geography, horticultural sciences, food science and environmental protection engineering. Haber held his chair until his retirement in 1993, and was active there even longer.

=== Influence on government and institutions ===
Haber influenced the scientific and environmental policy development of nature conservation in Germany and internationally. From 1972 to 1994, he was a member of the advisory board for Nature Conservation and Landscape Management at the Federal Ministry of Food and Agriculture (moved in 1986 to the Federal Ministry for the Environment, Nature Conservation and Nuclear Safety). During the same period, he also was a member of a similar board in Bavaria. Haber took a leading role in the founding of biotope mapping and was instrumental in the establishment of the first German National Parks, Bavarian Forest National Park and Berchtesgaden National Park. He was a member of the German Federal Council of Environmental Advisors and editor of five important reports on the state of the environment, from 1981, serving as its chairman from 1985. He was a member from 1981 of the Deutscher Rat für Landespflege (German Council of Land Use Management), and its speaker from 1992 to 2003.

In 1970 Haber was a co-founder of the Gesellschaft für Ökologie (Society for Ecology), the association of ecologists of German-speaking countries, serving as its president from 1980 to 1989 and becoming its honorary member in 1993. He was a member of the Council of Experts on Environmental Issues of the Federal Government (SRU) from 1980, becoming its president in 1985. After German reunification, Haber advised universities in the East. He served from 1990 to 1996 as President of the International Association of Ecology (Intecol), the umbrella organization of national scientific ecology associations.

=== Book ===
In a 2010 publication, Die unbequemen Wahrheiten der Ökologie – Eine Nachhaltigkeitsperspektive für das 21. Jahrhundert ('The Inconvenient Truths of Ecology – A Sustainability Perspective for the 21st Century'), Haber rejected mystifying notions about the nature of humankind and the natural world, saying that the path to a sustainable future can only succeed if we return to reality and focus our attention on the key problems of the 21st century, which he identified as the finite nature of resources and the immense population growth. He called for an understanding that these factual processes are the result of human actions, building on the human-ecological perspectives of Carl von Carlowitz.

=== Personal life ===
Haber turned 100 on 13 September 2025.

He died on 13 August 2026, one month short of his 101st birthday.

== Awards ==
In 1993, Haber was awarded the first German Environmental Prize from the Deutsche Bundesstiftung Umwelt (DBU, Federal Foundation for the Environment).

- 1973: Bavarian Order of Merit
- 1986: Bruno H. Schubert Prize
- 1986: Order of Merit of the Federal Republic of Germany
- 1988: Justus von Liebig Prize
- 1993: German Environmental Prize
- 1993: Bavarian Maximilian Order for Science and Art
- 2024: Reinhold Tüxen Prize of Rinteln.

== Publications ==
Haber's publications include:

- Wolfgang Haber: Die unbequemen Wahrheiten der Ökologie [The uncomfortable truths of ecology]. Oekom Verlag 2010. ISBN 978-3-86581-217-9 (also published in English)
- Konstanze Schönthaler, Wolfgang Haber: Concept for integrated environmental monitoring. Umweltbundesamt, Berlin 1998. OCLC 64635493
- Wolfgang Haber: Nachhaltiger Umgang mit Böden. Initiative für eine internationale Bodenkonvention. [Sustainable management of soils. Initiative for an international soil convention.] Süddeutsche Zeitung, Munich 1999. ISBN 978-3-00-005065-7
- Wolfgang Haber: Quantifizierung raumspezifischer Entwicklungsziele des Naturschutzes [Quantification of space-specific development goals for nature conservation]. Verlag der ARL, Hannover 1993 ISBN 978-3-88838-218-5
- Wolfgang Haber: Ökologische Grundlagen des Umweltschutzes [Ecological Principles of Environmental Protection]. Economica-Verlag, Bonn 1993. ISBN 978-3-87081-482-3
- Haber, Wolfgang / Jürgen Salzwedel (Eds.): Umweltprobleme der Landwirtschaft [Environmental Problems of Agriculture] Rat von Sachverständigen für Umweltfragen, JB Metzler-Poeschel, Stuttgart, 1993. ISBN 978-3-8246-0334-3
- Wolfgang Haber: Ökosystemforschung Berchtesgaden [Ecosystem Research Berchtesgaden]. Forschungsbericht 101 04 040/04, UBA-FB 86–114. Berlin 1990.
- Wolfgang Haber: Naturschutz und Landesentwicklung, Forderungen der Ökologie [Nature Conservation and Land Development – Demands of Ecology]. With an introduction by Carl Friedrich von Weizsäcker. Second edition, Callwey, Munich 1974.
- Wolfgang Haber: Naturschutz und Landesentwicklung, Forderungen der Ökologie [Nature Conservation and Land Development – Demands of Ecology]. DP system Andernach 1972.
