= Alice, the Zeta Cat and Climate Change =

German Adult Fairytale

Alice, the Zeta Cat and Climate Change: A fairytale about the truth
- First edition
- Author: Margret Boysen
- Original title: Alice, der Klimawandel und die Katze Zeta
- Translator: Margitt Lehbert
- Cover artist: Iassen Ghiuselev
- Language: German
- Genre: Climate fiction
- Publication place: Germany
- English publication date: forthcoming
- Media type: Print (hardback)
- Website: www.pik-potsdam.de/news/press-releases/201calice-the-zeta-cat-and-climate-change201d-a-fairytale-about-the-truth

Alice, the Zeta Cat and Climate Change: A fairytale about the truth (German: Alice, der Klimawandel und die Katze Zeta) is an adult fairytale about the truth by Margret Boysen.

== Plot ==
The heroine of the story, Alice, falls down a hole while on a school excursion on Potsdam's Telegraphenberg (where PIK is situated. She meets some characters which also appear in Alice in Wonderland, like the Zeta Cat.

Unlike Lewis Carroll’s Cheshire Cat, Zeta knows exactly how to figure out a correct pathway. That is how the "mathematical-metaphorical animal" can help Alice, the heroine of this story, to get her bearings in the wondrous world of science and climate change. The girl not only journeys through computer models, where she experiences glacial cycles in super-fast motion and the calamitous drying-up of rainforests, she also undergoes an inner journey through feelings like guilt and compassion. Alice enters the "Library of Truth" and is shown the very limits of knowledge, visits an "Error Bar" run by shady rats, and eventually makes friends with a mysterious walrus. When she stumbles upon a climate conference that mutates into an absurd court hearing, she is forced to take a stand. Together with a companion rabbit and the albatross Molly Mauk, a wind-and-weather expert, Alice is caught in a battle between logic, poetry and treason. The girl’s empathy nearly seals her fate. Eventually, however, spectacular powers weigh in to save her.

It is Boysen's first novel. It is loosely based on Alice's Adventures in Wonderland; the author who is a geologist by training, leads PIK’s "Artist in Residence programme".

== See also ==
- Climate change (general concept)
- Global warming
