= Wake-equalising duct =

Ship hull appendage to modify propeller inflow

A wake-equalising duct is a ship hull appendage mounted in the inflow region of a screw propeller intended to realign and adjust the velocity of the wake at the inflow to the propeller disc. Wake velocity may be straightened out, given contra-rotational swirl, accelerated, or a combination of these effects, all of which can improve propeller efficiency, giving either higher thrust or reducing power requirement for the same thrust.

== Structure ==
The wake-equalising duct is a static flow modifier attached to the hull upstream of the propeller within the wake. It may be made of a single circular section duct directly ahead of the propeller, with fixed internal and/or external fins to impart rotational changes to the wake flow, or as two semicircular ducts mounted further forwards, one on each side of the hull, aligned to provide the desired flow modification. The duct(s) may be eccentrically mounted to include mainly the thickest part of the wake. This offset would usually be above the centre of the shaft.

== Function ==
There are four components to the wake modification.

1. The wake is accelerated by the shape of the duct to be closer to the free-stream velocity of water over the rest of the propeller disc.
2. The direction of flow is aligned more closely with the free stream inflow.
3. A contra-rotational swirl may be induced, which will reduce outflow vorticity.
4. Flow separation at the afterbody may be reduced, which can reduce the thrust-deduction factor

These have the effect of increasing the efficiency of the propeller as it is working in a more uniform flow, and less energy is lost to hub vortex. The more uniform inflow conditions can also significantly reduce propeller blade vibration. Fuel savings of up to 12% have been claimed. The system has the greatest benefit on hulls where the inflow conditions are inherently more disturbed.

== Versions ==
The Becker Mewis Duct is a version based on an eccentric annular nozzle fitted between the hull and the propeller, supported by a number of flow directing radial vanes, each of which is angled to optimise inflow direction. The design is patented and has been in use since 2009.

The Schneekluth Wake Equalising Duct is a version using two semicircular nozzles, one on each side of the hull, centred above the shaft centreline, and angled to provide contra-rotational outflow swirl.
