= Fröschl =

Fröschl is a surname. Notable people with the name include:

- Alexander Fröschl (born 1992), Austrian footballer
- Karl Fröschl (born 1926), Austrian former sports shooter
- Thomas Fröschl (born 1988), Austrian footballer
- Wiguleus Fröschl of Marzoll (1445–1517), German nobleman
