= Froschauer (surname) =

Froschauer is a German-language surname.

== People ==
- Christoph Froschauer (ca. 1490–1564), printer in Zürich
  - Froschauer Bibel, a Zwinglian bible printed in Zürich from 1525 by Christoph Froschauer
- Daniel Froschauer (born 1965), Austrian classical violinist, member of the board of directors of the Vienna Philharmonic (son of Hellmuth)
- Helmuth Froschauer (1933–2019), Austrian conductor, especially a choral conductor (father of Daniel)
- Scott Froschauer, American artist, sculptor, and key grip
