= Yellow sack =

Standard waste container in Germany and Austria

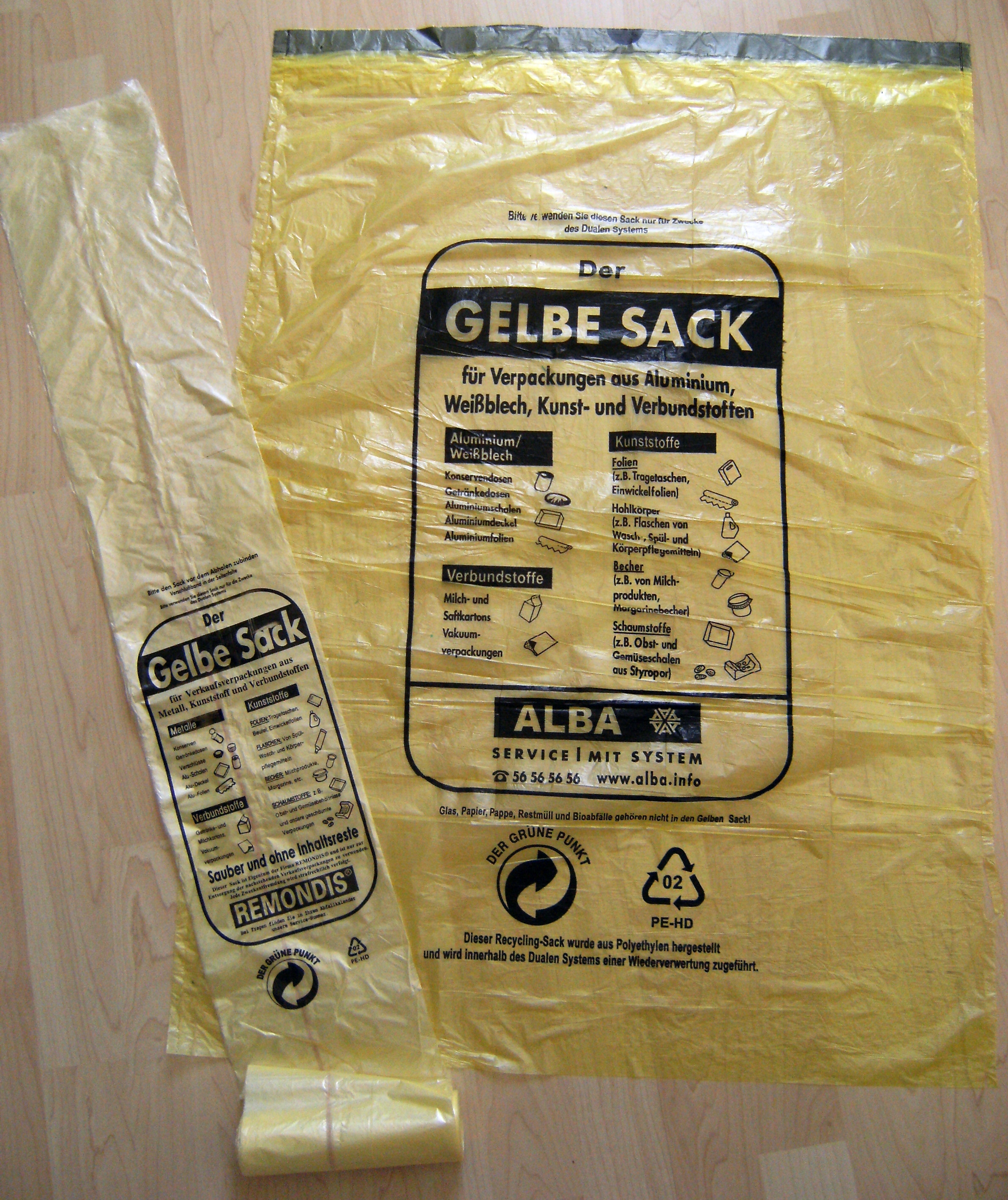
Yellow bags before use

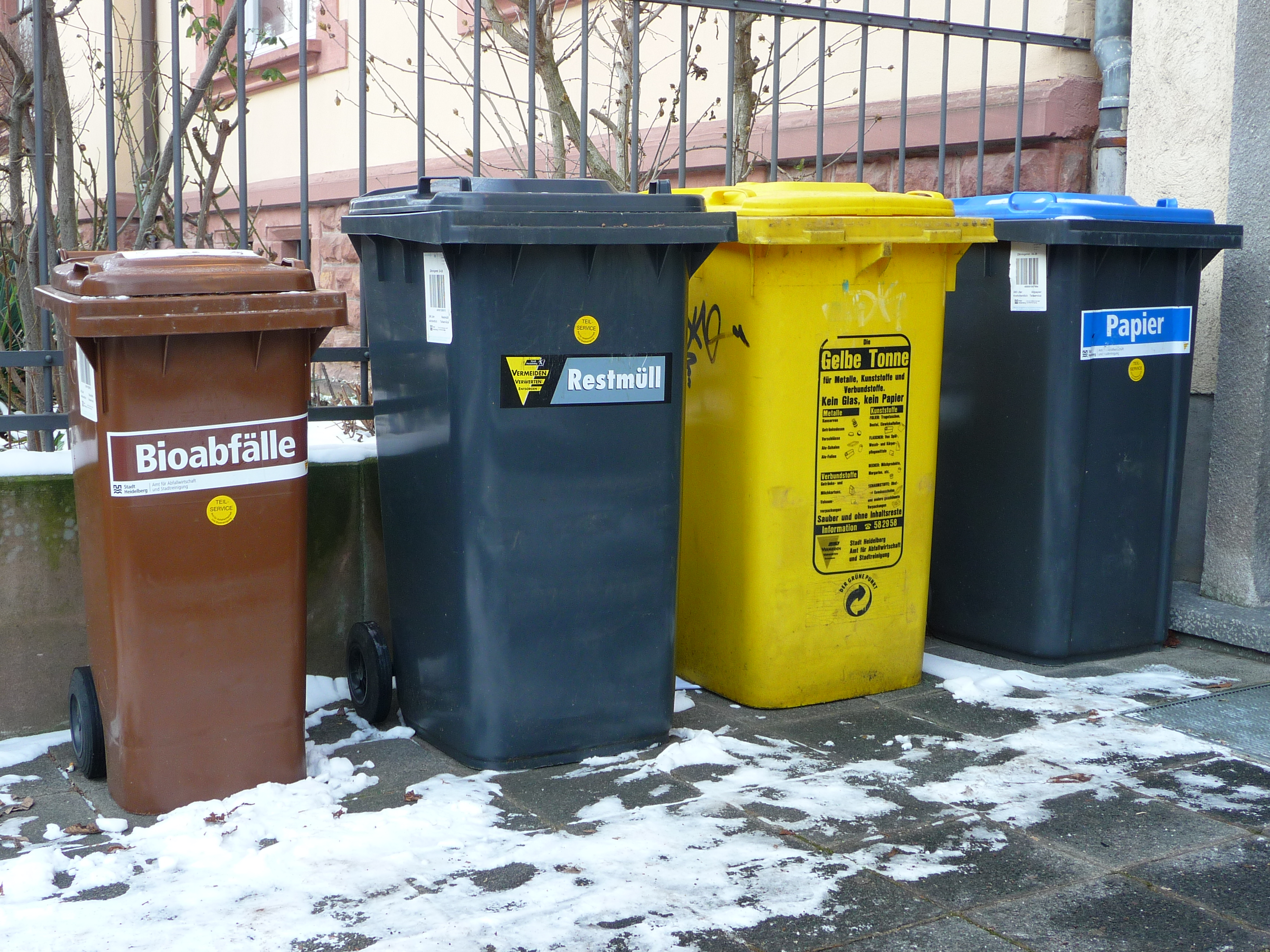
Yellow bin in Germany

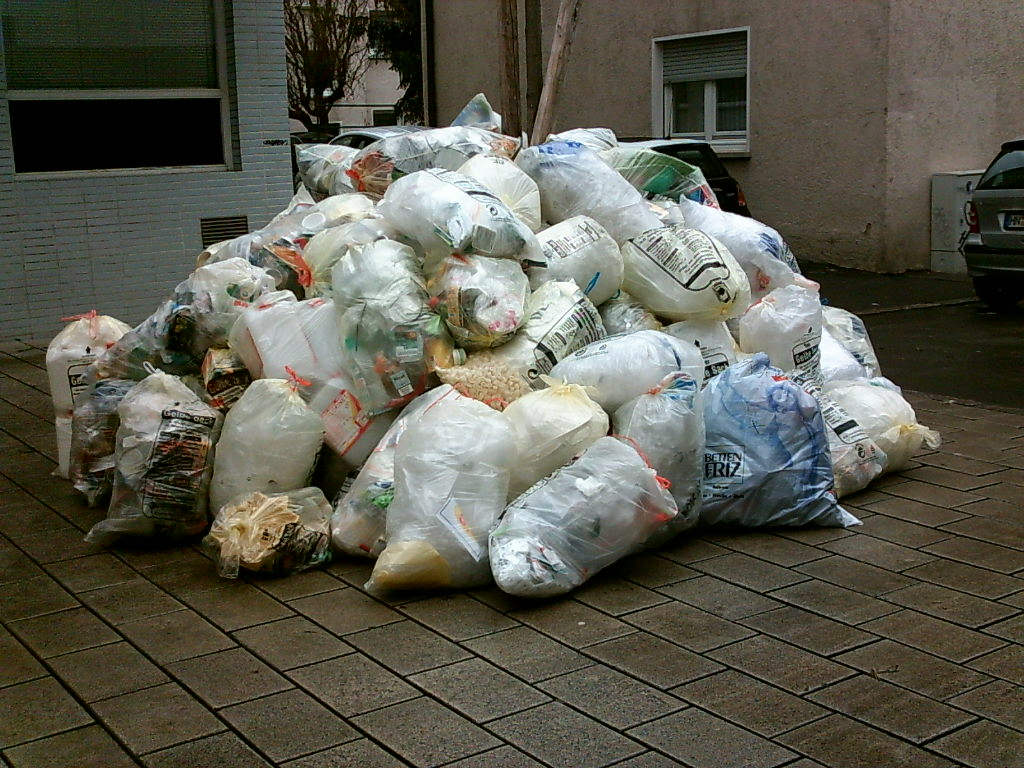
Filled sacks before disposal

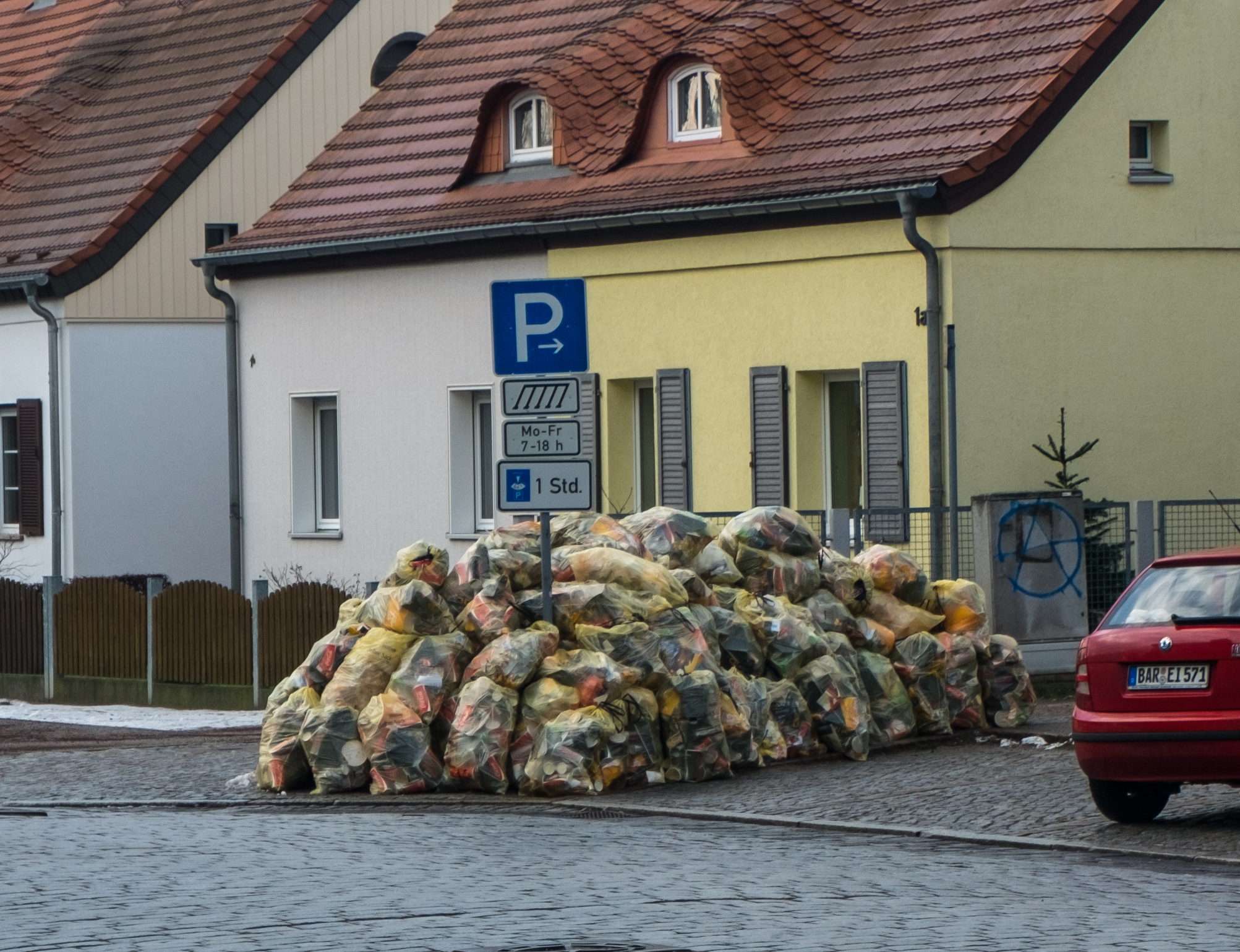
Yellow bags with commercial waste

In Germany and Austria, the term yellow bag (German: Gelbe Sack) refers to a thin, yellowish transparent plastic bag, in which, in the context of local waste disposal, any waste made of plastic, metal or composite materials can be handed in. Depending on the agreement with the cities and municipalities, it may also be possible to use a 'yellow bin' (German: Gelbe Tonne). Yellow bags or yellow bins are part of the Dual System in the German waste management industry.

The waste collected in the yellow sack is mainly sorted mechanically in special sorting plants. In the first few years after the introduction of the Yellow Bag in 1991, the majority of waste still had to be sorted by hand, as the necessary techniques and machines were not available. In the 1990s, the corresponding technologies were developed and are now standard practice.

In some other European countries there are yellow dustbin containers for the disposal of light packaging. It is not necessary to pack the separated waste in a special waste bag before disposal. The dimensions of a (folded) yellow bag are 90 cm × 62 cm. In the United Kingdom, yellow bags are used for clinical waste.

== Origin ==
The sacks are produced by billions in the Far East and delivered to the local authorities via wholesalers and waste disposal companies, who in turn distribute them free of charge to households and, in addition, keep them available for take-away in town halls and recycling centres.

== Pick up and transport ==
The collection of the sacks filled with waste is carried out by companies commissioned by the Dual System, either by waste collection or private specialist disposal companies, with certain streets in a city being served on certain days of the week. If no waste information exists, the responsible city administration will usually tell you when the collection is to take place. In some districts (e.g. District Pfaffenhofen, District Ravensburg), however, the yellow bags must be transported by the citizens themselves at their own expense to central collection points which are only open on certain days; in the district of Pfaffenhofen, a citizens' survey was conducted on this in 2014. Via disposal logistics, the yellow bags are transported to the waste sorting plant, which carries out the sorting. The legal basis is provided by the Packaging Ordinance. ("VerpackV"). The empty yellow bag is not recycled, but can be used as a substitute fuel e.g. in cement works. If it is too dirty, it is sent as the rest to the waste incineration plant.

== Contents ==
The following rules must be observed for the contents of the yellow bag or the yellow bin: Only packaging made of plastic, metal or composite materials belong in the yellow bag (or directly in the yellow bin), (examples):

- Packaging made of plastic
- Bubble wrap
- Aluminum cans and PET bottles that are deposit free
- Detergent bottles, yoghurt pots, plastic tubes, toothpaste tubes, packaging for oral hygiene, hair and body care products
- cartons of milk, water, juice and wine (e.g. Tetra Pak) - cartons made of composite materials (such as beverage cartons of milk, juice or wine) belong in the yellow bag, since the paper part of this composite material can be used, for example, to make tissue paper and handkerchiefs
- Plastic bags, ice cream packagings
- Packaging made of composite materials
- Vacuum packaging for coffee, polystyrene packaging etc.
- Packaging made of metal, aluminium foil, beverage and tin cans, crown caps, metal closures, lids, blister packs for medicines etc.

To note:

- in Austria, these metallic materials are collected separately in some municipalities
- in some municipalities in Bavaria tins and other metal waste are still collected separately via depot containers
- certain items such as CDs or DVDs and batteries do not belong in the yellow bag, only the empty plastic sleeves are allowed
- Glass belongs in the bottle bank, - the separate glass waste collection existed before the introduction of the Packaging Ordinance
- Packaging made of cardboard or paper is waste paper and should not be disposed of in the yellow bag.

== Recycling rate ==
According to an answer to a parliamentary question by Bärbel Höhn, the recycling rate for tinplate in Germany in 2009 was 92 percent, for aluminium 60 percent and for plastics 43 percent. In 2012, according to the Gesellschaft für Verpackungsmarktforschung (GVM), the material recycling rate was 93.1 percent for tinplate, 71 percent for beverage packaging and 48.2 percent for plastics. On behalf of the Federal Environment Agency, GVM determined in a study published in 2015 that the packaging waste occurrence in private households in 2013 was 8.06 million tonnes.

In Germany, less than half of the packaging from the yellow sack (and the yellow bin) is recycled. In 2014, on the other hand, 44.1 percent was disposed of in waste incineration plants. According to a calculation by the Öko-Institute, 51.1% was used as substitute fuel in cement works, 40% as input for material recycling, 6% as input for waste incineration plants and 2.8% as input for raw material recycling in blast furnaces.

== Future ==
The yellow bag could disappear in the long term, say scientists for waste management such as Klaus Wiemer (Kassel) and Horst Fehrenbach at the Institute for Energy and Environmental Research (Heidelberg): As the willingness of Germans to separate their waste is declining, expensive sorting machines could soon make sense. This is especially true if rising energy prices lead to competition for waste recycling. So far, however, new, expensive sorting machines are not economical.
