= Social cost of carbon =

Monetary damage caused by greenhouse gases

The social cost of carbon (SCC) is an estimate, typically expressed in dollars, of the economic damages associated with emitting one additional ton of carbon dioxide into the atmosphere. By translating the effects of climate change into monetary terms, the SCC provides policymakers with a tool to assess the potential impacts of actions that increase or reduce greenhouse gas emissions. It is commonly used in regulatory impact analyses to inform investment decisions, cost-benefit assessments, and climate policy development.

== History ==
The concept of pricing environmental externalities was first proposed by economist Arthur Pigou in 1912, who suggested taxing activities that generate negative externalities, such as pollution. Although Pigou's framework did not specifically address carbon dioxide emissions, it laid the intellectual foundation for the development of the Social Cost of Carbon.

In the early 1990s, economist William Nordhaus introduced the Dynamic Integrated Climate-Economy (DICE) model, one of the first Integrated Assessment Models (IAMs) to explicitly estimate the external costs of greenhouse gas emissions. His work helped formalize the idea that economic damages from climate change could be quantified.

Various countries began implementing carbon pricing schemes in the 2000s, including the European Union Emissions Trading Scheme (EU ETS) in 2005 and New Zealand's ETS in 2008. Meanwhile, the UK explored IAM-based policy evaluation with the Government Economic Service Working Paper 140 in 2002.

In 2007, the United States Court of Appeals for the Ninth Circuit ruled in Center for Biological Diversity v. National Highway Traffic Safety Administration that the federal government must account for the monetary effects of climate change in regulatory analyses.

The United States formalized the Social Cost of Carbon under President Barack Obama in 2010. An Interagency Working Group (IWG) composed of 12 federal agencies developed the first U.S. government SCC estimates, drawing on outputs from three IAMs: DICE, FUND, and PAGE. These estimates were updated in 2013 and 2016. In 2017, the National Academies of Sciences, Engineering, and Medicine issued recommendations for improving SCC calculations. However, Executive Order 13783 under President Donald Trump disbanded the IWG. President Joe Biden reinstated the IWG through Executive Order 13990 in 2021, directing it to update SCC estimates to reflect scientific advances.

In 2025, President Trump signed an executive order to again disband the IWG, and the Environmental Protection Agency (EPA) subsequently announced plans to "overhaul" SCC calculations.

== Adoption ==
Following Nordhaus's early work, the concept of the Social Cost of Carbon gained prominence through the Stern Review (2006) and the formation of the U.S. Interagency Working Group in 2009. The SCC became a standard tool for regulatory analysis under the Obama administration.

== Use by Country ==
In addition to SCC estimates, many countries and regions have implemented direct carbon pricing programs or shadow valuation frameworks. The following table highlights major initiatives:
Program	Country/Region	Launch Year	Type
EU Emissions Trading Scheme (EU ETS)	European Union	2005	Cap-and-trade
New Zealand Emissions Trading Scheme (NZ ETS)	New Zealand	2008	Cap-and-trade
Korea Emissions Trading Scheme (K-ETS)	South Korea	2015	Cap-and-trade
Canadian Carbon Pricing	Canada	2019	Federal carbon price with provincial systems
China National ETS	China	2021	Cap-and-trade (power sector)
German GIVE Model (Greenhouse Gas Inclusive Valuation Estimate)	Germany	2024	Shadow pricing for regulatory impact

Non-linear growth in the global warming effect of accumulating long-lived greenhouse gases contributed to economic damages over a 60-year period estimated to be over five times as large as that of a 30-year period (shown in chart). A Nature article estimated future damages from past emissions to be at least an order of magnitude larger than historical damages from the same emissions.

The SCC is distinct from carbon pricing tools such as taxes or cap-and-trade systems. (Note: The Social Cost of Carbon (SCC) is an estimate of the economic damage from emitting one additional ton of CO_{2}, used in regulatory and cost-benefit analysis. Carbon pricing applies actual market costs (e.g., carbon taxes) to incentivize reductions. The Social Cost of Carbon (SCC) is an estimate of the economic damage from emitting one additional ton of CO_{2}, used in regulatory and cost-benefit analysis. Carbon pricing applies actual market costs (e.g., carbon taxes) to incentivize reductions.)

The Social Cost of Carbon or similar approaches have been adopted globally, though implementations differ:

- United States: Fluctuations under Obama ($51/ton, 3% discount rate), Trump ($1–$7/ton, focusing on domestic damages), and Biden (proposed >$190/ton, accounting for global damages at lower discount rates).
- Canada: Integrates SCC estimates directly into fuel pricing regulations.
- United Kingdom and France: Apply "shadow pricing" in regulatory impact assessments, embedding a cost of carbon without a direct market price.
- Germany: Introduced the GIVE model in 2024 to better capture long-term uncertainties.
- China, New Zealand, South Korea, and others: Operate emissions trading systems (ETS) that reflect implicit or explicit carbon costs.

Discount rates, scope of damages (global vs. domestic), and valuation methods vary substantially across 40 governments and 25 sub-governmental entities that currently employ some form of carbon pricing.

== Calculation ==
=== Basic Process ===
SCC calculations typically involve:

1. Projecting Future Emissions: Based on economic growth, technological change, and demographics.
2. Modeling Climate Responses: Simulating atmospheric CO_{2} levels, temperature increases, sea level rise and other changes.
3. Assessing Impacts: Evaluating effects on agriculture, health, energy use, infrastructure, and ecosystems.
4. Monetizing Damages: Converting impacts into monetary terms.
5. Discounting Future Damages: Applying a discount rate to reflect time preferences.

=== Key Factors that Influence Social Cost of Carbon ===
Sources:

- Climate sensitivity (how much warming one ton of carbon causes, estimated via IAMs)
- Economic assumptions/growth projections
- Discount Rate Choice
- Global vs. domestic damage scope
- Inclusion of non-market damages (i.e. ecosystem services)

=== Discount Rates ===
The discount rate affects how future damages are valued today. A simplified example: an offer to receive $100 now or $110 in a year implies a 10% simple discount rate. In climate economics:

- Low discount rate (1–2%): Future generations' welfare valued nearly equally with today's.
- High discount rate (4–5%): Present benefits are prioritized and future damages are heavily discounted.

Discounting formula:

$PV=\frac{FV}{(1+r)^{t}}$

where PV = present value, FV = future value, r = discount rate, and t = time.

Recent literature supports declining discount rates, starting higher in the near-term but decreasing over time to reflect long-term uncertainty and ethical considerations.

=== Equations ===
==== Risk-Neutral Damages ====
Captures the central tendency cost of emitting 1 additional ton of CO_{2} today without accounting for catastrophic risks or risk aversion

$SCC_{1} = MDR\times HDP \times TCRE \times \frac{1}{FDR}$

- MDR: Marginal Damage Ratio- How much global GDP drops per degree Celsius of warming
- HDP: Horizon Discounted GDP- Present value of global GDP over time (used to weight future damages)
- TCRE: Transient Climate Response to Cumulative Emissions- How much global temperature increases (in degrees C) per 1,000 gigatonnes of CO_{2} emitted (about 1.8 °C/1 trillion tons of carbon)
- FDR: Future Discount Rate- Applied to calculate the present value of future damages

==== Catastrophic Risk Premium ====
Adds a risk premium to account for potential catastrophic damage, uncertainty, and risk aversion

$SCC_{2}=SCC_{1}+\frac{(MCRD\times MDD)}{(1-RA\times MDD)}\times V\times TCRE\times\frac{1}{R}$

- MCRD: Marginal Catastrophe Risk Density- Change in the probability of a disaster per ton of CO_{2} emitted
- MDD: Mean Disaster Damage- Expected GDP loss if a catastrophe occurs
- RA: Relative Risk Aversion- How strongly society prefers to avoid risk
- V: Value of GDP- Total or marginal economic value at risk (often equivalent to global GDP)
- R: Discount rate for catastrophic events (may differ from FDR in SCC_{1})

The final SCC combines risk-neutral and risk-adjusted components.

== Integrated Assessment Models (IAMs) ==
Three principal Integrated Assessment Models - DICE, FUND, and PAGE - have historically underpinned SCC calculations. DICE emphasizes a globally-aggregated, deterministic pathway that optimizes mitigation costs against economic damages. FUND introduces more granular regional and sectoral variation, allowing for some beneficial warming effects in higher latitudes. PAGE, by contrast, is probabilistic, explicitly modeling uncertain catastrophic risks. These methodological differences can lead to dramatically different SCC values. Obama-era SCC relied on an average across multiple runs of DICE, FUND and PAGE.

=== DICE (Dynamic Integrated Climate Economy) ===
Optimizes emissions abatement based on cost-benefit balance, tends to produce lower SCCs because it ignores deep uncertainty and treats damage as reversible

Assumptions:

- Climate and economic systems are tightly coupled in a smooth, deterministic way
- Damages increase with the square of temperature (i.e., GDP loss = a × T^{2})
- Doesn't include tipping points or fat-tailed catastrophic risk

=== FUND (Framework for Uncertainty, Negotiation, and Distribution) ===
Shows wide variation in SCC depending on who's affected and when, can understate damages dure to assumptions about adaptation and potential warming benefits

Assumptions:

- Models multiple impact categories (e.g., agriculture, health, sea level rise) by region
- Includes some adaptation responses over time
- Allows for negative damages (i.e., benefits from warming in some regions/sectors)

=== PAGE (Policy Analysis of the Greenhouse Effect) ===
Produces higher SCC estimates with large uncertainty bands, complexity & uncertainty can make outputs difficult for policy communication

Assumptions:

- Uses Monte Carlo simulations to model thousands of futures
- Probabilistic treatment of catastrophic events and tipping points
- Damages increase sharply after certain thresholds
- Often uses declining discount rates

== Tipping Points ==
Standard IAMs tend to assume smooth, continuous damages from warming, which may underestimate risk by ignoring climatic tipping points.

More recent models incorporate tipping elements using threshold functions or probabilistic catastrophe modules. This method accounts for the abrupt, irreversible impacts (ice sheet collapse, AMOC disruption) that occur when the climate crosses critical thresholds. Modeling studies suggest that including tipping points can double the SCC.

=== Tipping Point Additions to the Social Cost of Carbon Equation ===
==== Threshold function in damage term ====
$SCC_{3} = c\times1(T>T^{*})+SCC_{1} + SCC_{2}$

- T^{2} = base damage function, meaning damages increase with the square of global temperature rise (i.e. 1 °C, little damage; 2 °C, 4x damage, 3 °C, 9x damage). This represents a smooth escalation of climate harm.
- T^{3} adds nonlinearity to the damage function, with the idea being that once warming passes 2-3 °C, damages might accelerate even faster than T^{2}. This accounts for feedback loops without jumping straight to tipping points
- ×1(T > T*) is an indicator function that activates when temperature exceeds tipping threshold T* (e.g. 3 or 4 °C). C = added cost from a tipping point event (e.g. polar ice sheet collapse). This kicks in suddenly, making the damage function discontinuous.

==== Stochastic Tipping Point Module ====
$SCC_{4} = Base Damages+Pr(Tipping)\times Expected Catastrophic Damages$

Adds a probabilistic tipping event that increases expected damages

== Criticism ==
While the social cost of carbon is sometimes used in policymaking and economic analysis, it has been subjected to criticism from economists, scientists and ethicists. These critiques fall into three broad categories: methodological uncertainty, ethical limitations, and political vulnerability.

1. Extreme sensitivity to assumptions: SCC estimates are highly sensitive to a small number of assumptions, especially the discount rate, the climate damage function, and the climate sensitivity parameter. Philosophical choices about valuing future generations can dramatically influence SCC estimates.
2. Inadequate treatment of uncertainty and catastrophic risk: IAMs often overlook low-probability, high-impact climate events. This omission can lead to underestimating the true economic risks associated with climate change.
3. Ethical concerns and intergenerational injustice: the SCC has been criticized for embedding utilitarian and economically rationalist ethics that may not align with broader moral values.
4. Political manipulation and lack of transparency: the U.S. federal government under different administrations has produced wildly divergent SCC values, ranging from $6/ton under Trump (using a 7% discount rate) to over $51/ton under Biden (using a 3% discount rate). This volatility undermines the credibility of SCC as a stable policy guide and suggests that it can be tailored to serve political ends rather than objective analysis. Further, some IAMs are not open-source or lack sufficient transparency, making it difficult for the public or policymakers to evaluate the quality of the estimates.
5. Marginal logic vs. Planetary boundaries: Some scholars argue that the marginal nature of the SCC is fundamentally mismatched to the climate crisis. The SCC estimates the cost of one additional ton of CO_{2}, assuming the rest of the system stays constant. In this view, carbon budgets or absolute emissions caps may be more appropriate than pricing frameworks based on marginal harm.

=== Proposed Alternatives and Emerging Directions ===
- Declining discount rates
- Carbon budgets
- Consumption-based greenhouse gas emissions accounting
- Intergenerational equity frameworks
- Global minimum carbon price proposals

== Bibliography ==
=== Sources ===
- de Coninck, H.; Revi, A.; Babiker, M.; Bertoldi, P.; et al. (2018). "Chapter 4: Strengthening and Implementing the Global Response" (PDF). Global Warming of 1.5 °C. pp. 313–443.
- Stern Review (2006)
- Interagency Working Group SCC Reports (2010, 2013, 2016, 2021)
- Dietz et al. (2021) on tipping points
- Klenert et al. (2018) on equity and discounting
- IAM comparison studies
- Burke, Marshall; Zahid, Mustafa; Diffenbaugh, Noah S.; Hsiang, Solomon (25 March 2026). "Quantifying climate loss and damage consistent with a social cost of carbon". Nature. 651: 959–966. doi:10.1038/s41586-026-10272-6.

== See also ==
- Carbon pricing in Canada
- Carbon tax
- Economic analysis of climate change
- Energy law
- List of years in the environment
