= TCRE =

TCRE may refer to:

- Transient climate response to cumulative carbon emissions, a measure of the response of the Earth's climate to CO_{2}
- Transcervical Resection of the Endometrium, a surgical procedure to remove part of the uterus
