= Time value of carbon =

The time value of carbon is a conjecture that there is a greater benefit from reducing carbon dioxide or other greenhouse gas reduction immediately than reducing the same amount of emissions (or rate of emissions) in the future. According to this conjecture, carbon emissions are subject to a discount rate, similar to money, which means that the timing of carbon emissions is important to consider alongside their magnitude. This is not to be confused with the monetary discount rate applied to carbon emission or carbon sequestration projects. Rather, it is a discount rate applied to the physical carbon itself.

== Origins ==
Applying a discount rate to a physical resource can be attributed to works as early as S. V. Ciriacy-Wantrup's 1968 book Resource Conservation: Economics and Policies. More contemporary examples that refer specifically to the time value of carbon include "The Time Value of Carbon in Bottom-Up Studies," a chapter written by Kenneth R. Richards for the 1997 book Economics of Carbon Sequestration in Forestry, Larry Strain's 2017 white paper, "The Time Value of Carbon," developed for the Carbon Leadership Forum, as well as "The time value of carbon: An introductory exploration to support better decision making" published by Arup in 2024.

== Carbon emission pathways ==
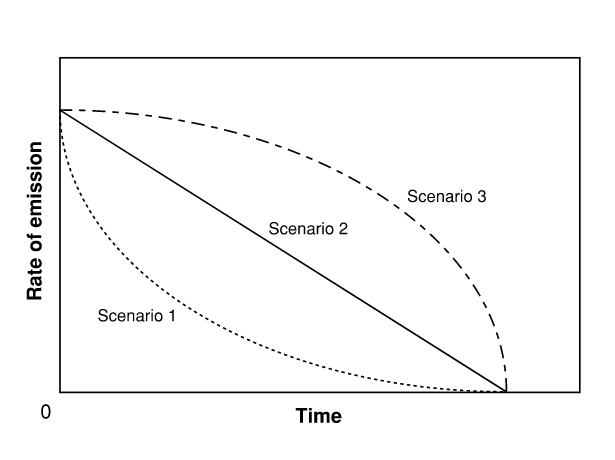
Graph illustrating multiple carbon pathways, with the rate of emission (for example in mass of equivalent CO_{2} per unit time) on the y-axis and time on the x-axis. Scenario 1 represents aggressive, early emissions reductions, Scenario 2 is a constant linear reduction to zero, and Scenario 3 is a delayed reduction that starts off slow and then accelerates.

Carbon emission pathways offer an example of the time value of carbon. This changing value can be illustrated using three potential future scenarios with differing rates of carbon emission reduction. Each scenario starts at the present and reaches zero emissions at the same time in the future. Scenario 1 cuts the rate of emission early and by a large amount, with diminishing reductions as time goes on until eventually the curve approaches and crosses zero. Scenario 2 assumes a constant reduction in the rate of emissions, and is represented by a straight line. Scenario 3 delays the reduction of emission rates compared to Scenarios 1 and 2. In Scenario 3, the rate of emission decreases only a small amount in the near term, and then drops off rapidly to zero shortly before the target date. The curve starts off flat and then declines steeply. Even though each of the three scenarios start and end at the same place, and in the same amount of time, the total amount of carbon emitted will be different in each pathway. This becomes apparent when integrating the three lines. The area under the curve -- which represents the total amount of CO_{2} emitted -- is smallest in Scenario 1, and largest in Scenario 3.

Each scenario corresponds with an approach that might be taken to combat climate change. Scenario 1 represents large, widespread, and immediate investments in carbon reduction strategies to achieve a drastic reduction in emission rate in the near future, with the last few percent of emissions being eliminated in the far future. Scenario 3 represents an approach that does not immediately require drastic change, and relies on technological improvements to make emission reductions easier in the far future. This approach assumes that once the requisite technologies/methods are discovered, they will be quickly implemented and the world will quickly reach a state of zero net emissions. Scenario 2 is more balanced, and assumes constant improvements in emission rates in both the near and far future. Due to the carbon emission discount rate, each of these scenarios will have a different cumulative impact on climate change, despite starting and ending at the same rate of emission.

== Discount rate ==
It is important to control the rate and amount of greenhouse gas emissions (often expressed with the shorthand of "carbon" and units of equivalent atmospheric CO_{2}) as high atmospheric concentrations pose a threat to humanity and the planet in the form of climate change. Since early reductions limit the total amount of atmospheric CO_{2} accumulation, carbon emissions have time preference -- they have higher value in the present than in the future. Exactly how much more value they have can be determined using a discount rate. Alternatively, a carbon discount rate can be set through policy in order to incentivize the shedding of carbon emissions. A high discount rate on emissions reductions or carbon sequestration incentivizes cutting emissions earlier. A low discount rate means that carbon emissions have similar value across time, and so there is less incentive to take immediate action towards reducing emissions. In the above example, a high discount rate may lead down the path of Scenario 1, whereas a low discount rate may produce Scenario 3.

This carbon discount rate is different from the social cost of carbon, which attempts to value the cost to society for a given unit of carbon emissions. It is also different from any monetary discount rate applied to a carbon infrastructure project, as this monetary rate would be subject to influence from other economic factors.

== In buildings ==
New construction and building operations contribute a large portion of global CO_{2} emissions. In the past, most of these emissions were attributable to the operation of the building: heating, cooling, lighting, and other energy demands from the use of the building. Building operational efficiency has continued to improve such that the embodied carbon of the building now comprise a larger portion of the building's total emissions over its lifespan. If the embodied and operational carbon emissions are comparable, then designers face the decision of which to optimize. High-performance, low operational energy, or net-zero buildings can often have high material emissions associated with construction. Due to the time value of carbon, it may be more environmentally friendly to continue using a building with lower energy performance than to make a large embodied carbon investment to replace it in pursuit of lower operating emissions. Reusing, retrofitting, or upgrading existing buildings avoids much of the immediate, embodied carbon cost of constructing an entirely new building.

== Additional implications of carbon discount rates ==
Returning to the three future scenarios, it is apparent that Scenario 3 presents the highest risk. This scenario has slow initial carbon emission reductions that accelerate over time, representing a willingness to rely on future technological advancements to compensate for high initial emission rates. To meet energy needs, carbon-heavy infrastructure would continue to be built while new technology is being developed. Eventually achieving net-zero carbon requires a steep decrease in the emission rate near the end of the scenario. This may be disruptive or depend on rapid deployment of emerging technologies, which raises the risk of current assets being abandoned or stranded for lack of energy performance, in which case the initial carbon investment to build them will be abandoned as well, even if they have not lived their full service life.

If a catastrophic climate disaster were to occur, the value of any avoided emissions or carbon removed from the atmosphere essentially becomes zero -- mitigation would have failed to avoid irreversible climate damages.

If the time value of carbon is positive -- that is, if carbon not emitted now is more valuable than carbon not emitted later -- then carbon sequestration projects, even those that are known to be temporary, have positive value. Storing carbon in trees or soil delays its introduction to the atmosphere to a point where it is less impactful, meaning that these projects can have a tangible benefit, even if the total amount of carbon emitted is exactly the same.

== See also ==
- Time value of money
- Social cost of carbon
- Carbon sequestration
