= DICE model =

Computer model of climate change

The Dynamic Integrated Climate-Economy model, referred to as the DICE model or Dice model, is a neoclassical integrated assessment model developed by 2018 Nobel Laureate William Nordhaus that integrates in the neoclassical economics, carbon cycle, climate science, and estimated impacts allowing the weighing of subjectively guessed costs and subjectively guessed benefits of taking steps to slow climate change. Nordhaus also developed the RICE model (Regional Integrated Climate-Economy model), a variant of the DICE model that was updated and developed alongside the DICE model. Researchers who collaborated with Nordhaus to develop the model include David Popp, Zili Yang, and Joseph Boyer.

The DICE model is one of the three main integrated assessment models used by the United States Environmental Protection Agency, and it provides estimates intermediate between the other two models.

== History ==
=== Precursors ===
According to a summary of the DICE and RICE models prepared by Stephen Newbold, the earliest precursor to DICE was a linear programming model of energy supply and demand in two 1977 papers of William Nordhaus. Although dynamic (in that it considered the changing levels of supply of fuel based on supply and demand and the consequence impact on carbon dioxide emissions) the model did not attempt to measure the economic impact of climate change. A 1991 paper by Nordhaus developed a steady-state model of both the economy and climate, coming quite close to the DICE model.

=== The model ===
The model appears to have first been proposed by economist William Nordhaus in a discussion paper for the Cowles Foundation in February 1992. He also wrote a brief note outlining the main ideas in an article for Science in November 1992. A subsequent revised model was published in Resource and Energy Economics in 1993.

Nordhaus published an improved version of the model in the October 1994 book Managing the Global Commons: The Economics of Climate Change, with the first chapter as well as an appendix containing a computer program both freely available online. Marian Radetzki reviewed the book for The Energy Journal.

In 1996, Nordhaus and Zili Yang published an article titled A regional dynamic general-equilibrium model of alternative climate-change strategies in The American Economic Review, establishing the RICE (Regional Integrated Model of Climate and the Economy) model.

In 1998, Nordhaus published a revised version of the DICE model in multiple papers, one of which was coauthored with Joseph Boyer in order to understand the effects of the proposed Kyoto Protocol.

In 1999, Nordhaus published computer programs and spreadsheets implementing a revised version of the DICE model as well as a variant called the RICE model (RICE stands for Regional Integrated Climate-Economics, signifying that the modeling of economics and climate are being done only for a particular region rather than the whole world).

In 2000, Nordhaus and Boyer co-authored a book published by MIT Press titled Warming the World: Economic Models of Global Warming with a detailed description of the updated DICE and RICE models.

In 2001, Nordhaus published revised spreadsheets for the RICE model.

In November 2006, Nordhaus published a new version of the DICE model with updated data, and used it to review the Stern Review.

In 2010, updated RICE and DICE models were published, and the new RICE model was explained by Nordhaus in an article for the Proceedings of the National Academy of Sciences (US).

In 2013, the book The Climate Casino by Nordhaus, with updated discussion of the DICE and RICE models and the broader policy implications, was published by Yale University Press. A background on the latest version of the models as used in the book was published on Nordhaus' website.

=== 2020 rework ===
In 2020, modelers from the Potsdam Institute for Climate Impact Research (PIK) reported a rerun of the DICE model using updated climate and economic information and found that the economically optimal climate goal was now less than 2.0 °C of global warming — and not the 3.5 °C that Nordhaus had originally calculated. The PIK team employed current understandings of the climate system and more modern social discount rates. This new result therefore broadly supports the Paris Agreement goal of holding global warming to "well below 2.0 °C". Their revised AMPL code and data are available under open licenses.

== Assumptions and outcomes ==
According to the original formulation of DICE, staying below the 2 °C as agreed by the Paris agreement would cost more in mitigation investments than would be saved in damage from climate change. A 2020 paper by Glanemann, Willner and Levermann, which used an updated damage function, revised this conclusion, showing that a warming of around 2 °C would be "optimal", depending on the climate sensitivity to greenhouse gases.

The DICE model is an example of a neoclassical energy-economy-environment model. The central assumption of this type of model is that market externalities create costs not captured in the price system and that government must intervene to assure that these costs are included in the supply price of the good creating the externality. Innovation is assumed to be exogenous; As such, the model is a pre-ITC model (it does not yet include Induced Technological Change). An extension of the model (DICE-PACE) that does include induced technological change, has strongly different outcomes: the optimal path would be to invest strongly early on in mitigation technology. In contrast to non-equilibrium models, investment in low carbon technology is assumed to crowd-out investments in other parts of the economy, leading to a loss of GDP.

== Reception ==
=== Academic reception ===
A number of variants of the DICE model have been published by researchers working separately from Nordhaus. The model has been criticised by Steve Keen for a priori assuming that 87% of the economy will be unaffected by climate change, misrepresenting contributions from natural scientists on tipping points, and selecting a high discount rate.

=== Reception in the public policy world ===
The DICE and RICE models have received considerable attention from others studying the economic impact of climate change. It is one of the models used by the Environmental Protection Agency for estimating the social cost of carbon. Stephen Newbold of the Environmental Protection Agency in the United States reviewed the models in 2010.

The Basque Centre for Climate Change, in an October 2009 review of integrated assessment models for climate change, discussed the DICE model in detail.

A report from The Heritage Foundation, a conservative and climate change denying think tank in the United States, called the DICE model "flawed beyond use for policymaking" on account of its extreme sensitivity to initial assumptions. Similar criticisms, including criticisms of the specific choice of discount rates chosen in the model, have been made by others. Many of these criticisms were addressed in the 2020 rework listed above.

== See also ==
- Integrated Global System Model
- Pigou Club
