= IGSM =

IGSM may refer to:

- International Geodetic Student Meeting (IGSM)
- Integrated Global System Model, an Integrated Assessment Model developed by MIT
- Isabella Stewart Gardner Museum
