= William Nordhaus =

American economist and Nobel laureate (1941–2026)

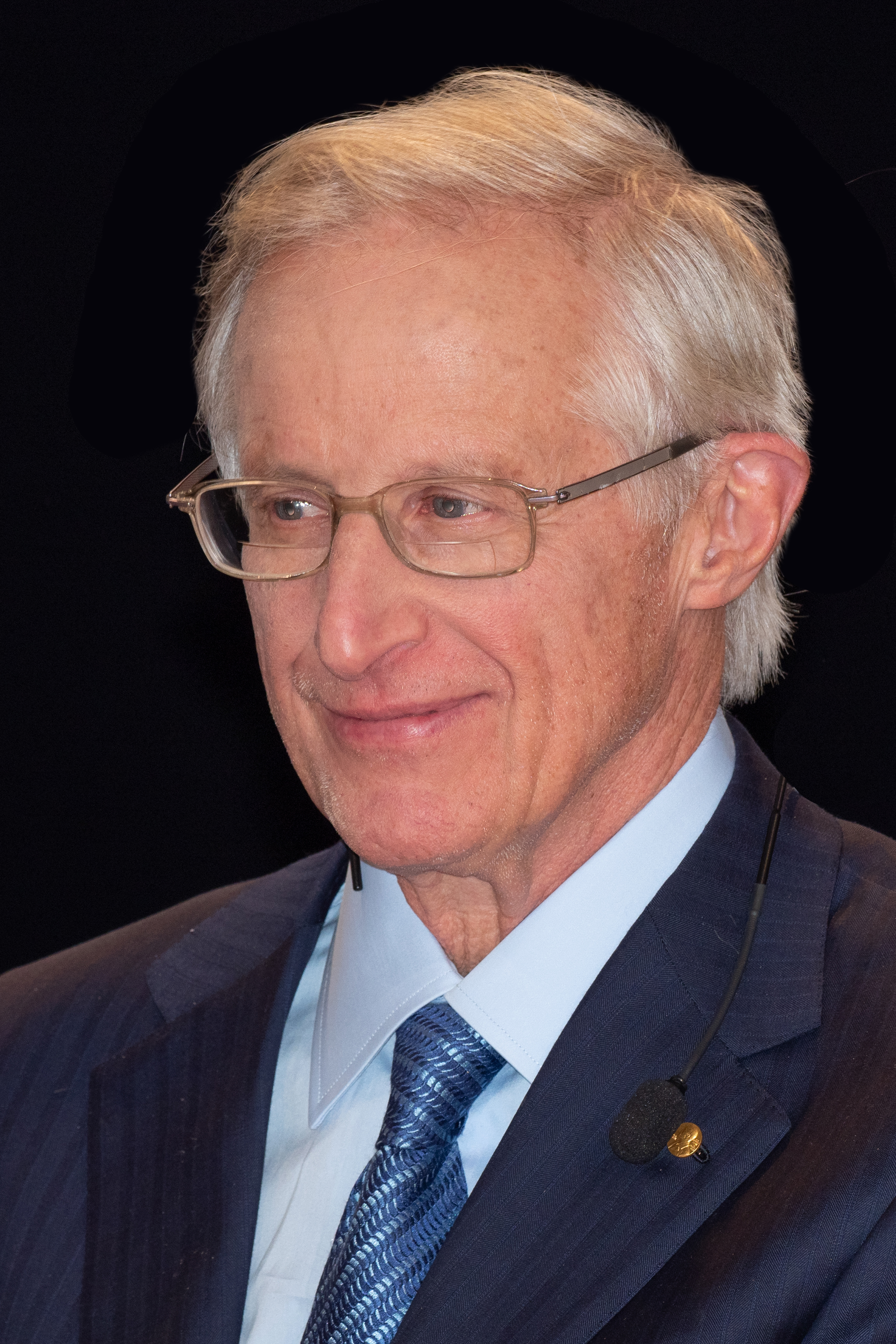
- Nordhaus in 2018
- Born: William Dawbney Nordhaus; May 31, 1941; Albuquerque, New Mexico, U.S.
- Died: October 30, 2026 (aged 85); New Haven, Connecticut, U.S.
- Education: Yale University (BA, MA); Paris Institute of Political Studies (certificate); Massachusetts Institute of Technology (PhD)
- Awards: BBVA Foundation Frontiers of Knowledge Award (2017); Nobel Memorial Prize in Economic Sciences (2018)
- Scientific career
- Fields: Environmental economics
- Workplaces: Yale University
- Thesis: A Theory of Endogenous Technological Change (1967)
- Doctoral advisor: Robert Solow

William Dawbney Nordhaus (May 31, 1941 – October 30, 2026) was an American economist. He was a Sterling professor of economics at Yale University, best known for his work in economic modeling and climate change, and a co-recipient of the 2018 Nobel Memorial Prize in Economic Sciences. Nordhaus received the prize "for integrating climate change into long-run macroeconomic analysis".

== Life and career ==
Nordhaus was born in Albuquerque, New Mexico, on May 31, 1941, the son of Virginia (Riggs) and Robert J. Nordhaus, who co-founded the Sandia Peak Tramway. Robert J. Nordhaus was from a German Jewish family – his father Max Nordhaus (1865–1936) had immigrated from Paderborn in 1883, and became a manager of The Charles Ilfeld Company branch in Albuquerque.

William Nordhaus graduated from Phillips Academy in Andover and subsequently received his BA and MA from Yale in 1963 and 1972, respectively, where he was a member of Skull and Bones. He also held a Certificate from the Institut d'Etudes Politiques (1962) and a PhD from MIT (1967). He was a visiting fellow of Clare Hall, Cambridge in 1970–1971. He was a member of the faculty at Yale from 1967 on, in both the Economics department and the School of the Environment. Nordhaus also served as its Provost from 1986 to 1988 and its vice president for finance and administration from 1992 to 1993. He was on the Brookings Panel on Economic Activity from 1972 on. During the Carter administration, from 1977 to 1979, Nordhaus was a member of the Council of Economic Advisers.

Nordhaus was elected to the American Philosophical Society in 2013. He served as the chairman of the board of directors of the Federal Reserve Bank of Boston between 2014 and 2015.

Nordhaus lived in New Haven, Connecticut, with his wife, Barbara, a social worker retired from the Yale Child Study Center. He died in New Haven of glioblastoma on October 30, 2026, at the age of 85.

== Contributions to economics and the study of climate change ==
Nordhaus was the author or editor of over 20 books. One of his early works is the popular introductory textbook, Economics, co-authored with Paul Samuelson. Originally a project of Samuelson's alone, Nordhaus worked on the textbook from the 12th edition until the 19th (the most recent edition), starting in 1985. The book was first published in 1948 and has appeared in nineteen different editions and seventeen different languages since then. It was a best-selling economics textbook for decades and is still popular today.

He also wrote several books on global warming and climate change, one of his primary areas of research. Those books include, Managing the Global Commons: The Economics of Climate Change (1994), which won the 2006 award for "Publication of Enduring Quality" from the Association of Environmental and Resource Economists. His other notable books include, Warming the World: Economic Models of Global Warming (2000), co-authored with Joseph Boyer; The Climate Casino: Risk, Uncertainty, and Economics for a Warming World; and The Spirit of Green: The Economics of Collisions and Contagions in a Crowded World (2021).

In 1972, Nordhaus, along with fellow Yale economics professor James Tobin, published "Is Growth Obsolete?", an article that introduced the Measure of Economic Welfare (MEW), or Index of Sustainable Economic Welfare (ISEW), as the first attempt to develop environmental accounting.

Nordhaus was also known for his critique of current measures of national income. For example, in a 1996 article, he wrote,

If we are to obtain accurate estimates of the growth of real incomes over the last century, we must somehow construct price indexes that account for the vast changes in the quality and range of goods and services that we consume, that somehow compare the services of horse with automobile, of Pony Express with facsimile machine, of carbon paper with photocopier, of dark and lonely nights with nights spent watching television, and of brain surgery with magnetic resonance imaging.

Economist Filip Palda summarizes the importance of Nordhaus's insight when he writes,

The practical lesson to be drawn from this fascinating study of lighting is that the way we measure the consumer price index is severely flawed. Instead of putting goods and their prices directly into the index we should reduce all goods to their constituent characteristics. Then we should evaluate how these goods can best be combined to minimize the cost of consuming these characteristics. Such an approach would allow us to include new goods in the consumer price index without worrying about whether the index of today is comparable to that of ten years ago when the good did not exist. Such an approach would also allow governments to more precisely calculate the rate at which welfare and other forms of aid should be increased. At present, such calculations tend to overestimate the cost of living because they do not take into account the manner in which increases in quality reduce the monetary cost of maintaining a certain standard of living.

=== Contributions on economics of climate change ===
Beginning in 1974, Nordhaus worked to quantify the economic impact of climate change and the costs of mitigation. While on the Council of Economic Advisers during the Carter administration he worked how to measure the economic benefits and costs of proposed regulations. The concept was incorporated into U.S. federal rule-making in 1981. He was an early advocate of carbon taxes or other means of putting a price on carbon dioxide emissions.

Nordhaus wrote on the economics of climate change. He was the developer of the DICE and RICE models, integrated assessment models of the interplay between economics, energy use, and climate change. In Reflections on the Economics of Climate Change (1993), he wrote,

Mankind is playing dice with the natural environment through a multitude of interventions–injecting into the atmosphere trace gases like the greenhouse gases or ozone-depleting chemicals, engineering massive land-use changes such as deforestation, depleting multitudes of species in their natural habitats even while creating transgenic ones in the laboratory, and accumulating sufficient nuclear weapons to destroy human civilizations.

According to the climate change models Nordhaus developed, sectors of the economy that depend heavily on unmanaged ecosystems–that is, are heavily dependent upon naturally occurring rainfall, runoff, or temperatures–will be most sensitive to climate change, generally. Agriculture, forestry, outdoor recreation, and coastal activities fall in this category. Nordhaus took seriously the potentially catastrophic impacts of climate change.

In 2007, Nordhaus, who conducted several studies on the economics of global warming, criticized the Stern Review for its use of a low discount rate, writing,

The Review's unambiguous conclusions about the need for extreme immediate action will not survive the substitution of discounting assumptions that are consistent with today's market place. So the central questions about global-warming policy–how much, how fast, and how costly–remain open. The Review informs but does not answer these fundamental questions.

In 2013, Nordhaus chaired a committee of the National Research Council that produced a report discounting the impact of fossil fuel subsidies on greenhouse gas emissions.

In 2015, Nordhaus published an article promulgating his concept of a "climate club". This publication has become widely debated and cited within and outside economics. He conceptualized this as a coalition of the willing among countries that wish to adopt more stringent climate mitigation policies. The climate club introduces carbon pricing among the club's member states and levies a fee on all imports of goods from countries that are outside the club and have not introduced similar carbon pricing. It has been argued that the carbon border adjustment mechanism (CBAM) of the European Union could become a climate club. A 2025 paper in Econometrica found the kind of climate club that Nordhaus advocated for, with border taxes to deter free-riding, "can achieve 33–68% of the globally optimal carbon reduction, depending on the initial coalition (EU, EU + US, or EU + US + China)."

In a January 2020 interview with Neue Zürcher Zeitung, Nordhaus claimed that achieving the 2 °C goal of the Paris agreement was "impossible", stating that, "even if we make the fastest possible turn towards zero emissions, CO_{2} will continue to accumulate in the atmosphere, because we cannot simply shut down our economy". He asserted that he was not alone in making this assessment, claiming that half of the simulations arrived at the same conclusion. He also remarked that the two-degree target was set without reference to the costs of meeting the target.

Ultimately, the impact of his work on climate mitigation was limited by substantial opposition funded by the fossil fuel industry.

== Honors ==
=== Scientific and engineering academies ===
Among numerous honors, Nordhaus was a Member of the United States National Academy of Sciences, the American Philosophical Society, and an Elected Fellow of the American Academy of Arts and Sciences. He was a foreign member of the Royal Swedish Academy of Engineering Sciences from 1999 on. He was awarded the Daniel Patrick Moynihan Prize by the American Academy of Political and Social Science in 2020.

=== American Economic Association ===
In 2004, Nordhaus was designated a Distinguished Fellow of the American Economic Association (AEA), along with George P. Shultz and William A. Brock. The accompanying AEA statement referred to his "knack for asking large questions about the measurement of economic growth and well-being, and addressing them with simple but creative insights", among them, his pioneering work on the political business cycle, ways of using national income accounts data to devise economic measures reflecting better health, increases in leisure and life expectancy, and "constructing integrated economic and scientific models to determine the efficient path for coping with climate change". In 2013, Nordhaus became president-elect of the AEA, and served as the association's president between 2014 and 2015.

=== Nobel Memorial Prize in Economics ===
Nordhaus was awarded the Nobel Memorial Prize in Economic Sciences in 2018, which he shared with Paul Romer. In detailing its reasons for giving the prize to Nordhaus, the Royal Swedish Academy of Sciences specifically recognized his efforts to develop "an integrated assessment model, i.e. a quantitative model that describes the global interplay between the economy and the climate. His model integrates theories and empirical results from physics, chemistry and economics. Nordhaus's model is now widely spread and is used to simulate how the economy and the climate co-evolve."

Many of the news outlets that reported on Nordhaus's prize noted that he was in the early wave of economists who embraced a carbon tax as a preferred method of carbon pricing. Some climate scientists and commentators were disappointed with the Nobel Prize going to Nordhaus due to his embrace of substantially lower carbon taxes per ton than most scientists, along with his past history of arguing for low carbon taxes.

== Evaluations ==
The Nobel Foundation described Nordhaus's work as follows: "William Nordhaus's findings deal with interactions between society, the economy and climate change. In the mid-1990s, he created a quantitative model that describes the global interplay between the economy and the climate. Nordhaus's model is used to examine the consequences of climate policy interventions, for example carbon taxes." Additionally, the Nobel Prize announcement commented that Nordhaus had "significantly broadened the scope of economic analysis by constructing models that explain how the market economy interacts with nature". In an evaluation of the work, Lint Barrage summarizes its impact, stating that the "body of work also represents science at its best: integrative across disciplines, visionary in scope yet incremental in progress, transparent, and producing knowledge for the benefit of humankind".

Critics of Nordhaus's DICE model focus on several aspects. One of the most important, incorporating political and moral philosophy, is the use of discounting, with an early study by William Cline. Another branch, represented by Robert Pindyck, holds that integrated assessment models cannot capture the complexity of the climate-economy nexus. Nicholas Stern argued that the damage function does not capture many of the most important risks to society. A particularly important critique, developed by Martin Weitzman, is that the economy-climate system may have "fat tails" and therefore inadequately deal with low probability, high consequence outcomes.

In an article by Christopher Ketcham in The Intercept there are a number of critical insights and critical views of Nordhaus's methods and assumptions, which didn't recognise or value tipping-cascades or non-elastic eco and environmental risk.

Post-Keynesian economist Steve Keen criticises the economics of climate change generally and the 2018 work by Nordhaus in particular:

... economists made their own predictions of damages, using three spurious methods: assuming that about 90% of GDP will be unaffected by climate change, because it happens indoors; using the relationship between temperature and GDP today as a proxy for the impact of global warming over time; and using surveys that diluted extreme warnings from scientists with optimistic expectations from economists.

When specifically speaking about Nordhaus, he says:

Nordhaus has misrepresented the scientific literature to justify the using a smooth function to describe the damage to GDP from climate change. Correcting for these errors makes it feasible that the economic damages from climate change are at least an order of magnitude worse than forecast by economists, and may be so great as to threaten the survival of human civilization.

== See also ==
- List of Jewish Nobel laureates

Academic offices
Preceded by Claudia Goldin	President of the American Economic Association; 2014– 2015	Succeeded by Richard Thaler
Awards
Preceded by Richard Thaler	Laureate of the Nobel Memorial Prize in Economics; 2018	Succeeded by Abhijit Banerjee; Esther Duflo
