= Emissions Trading Scheme in South Korea =

South Korea's Emissions Trading Scheme (KETS) is the second largest in scale after the European Union Emission Trading Scheme and was launched on January 1, 2015. South Korea is the second country in Asia to initiate a nationwide carbon market after Kazakhstan. Complying to the country's pledge made at the Copenhagen Accord of 2009, the South Korean government aims to reduce its greenhouse gas (GHG) emissions by 30% below its business as usual scenario by 2020. They have officially employed the cap-and-trade system and the operation applies to over 525 companies which are accountable for approximately 68% of the nation's GHG output. The operation is divided up into three periods. The first and second phases consist of three years each, 2015 to 2017 and 2018 to 2020. The final phase was spread out over the next five years from 2021 to 2025.

The cap-and-trade system is a tool of carbon pricing that has been adapted by several countries to mitigate greenhouse gas (GHG) emissions through a market mechanism. It entails a market open to the transaction of trade permits, which allow participating businesses or countries to emit a given amount of greenhouse gases. A cap is set by the government which defines the maximum level of total emissions permitted during a certain time period. The South Korean government had set the emissions cap for the first year of implementation (2015) as 573 MtCO_{2}e.

The major objectives of the KETS is to place South Korea at the forefront of the global effort in reducing GHG emissions and to develop its market competitiveness in the clean energy sector. As one of the top 10 largest contributors to global greenhouse gas emissions and a nation with the highest growth rate in GHG emissions, South Korea's awareness of its carbon footprint has increased over the years. The country grows more vulnerable to climate change as the average temperature has risen by 1.5 degrees Celsius causing frequent natural disasters. Furthermore, the South Korean government aims to cut back its reliance on imported fossil fuel energy which accounts for roughly 97% of its primary energy consumption. Lastly, by implementing the emissions trading scheme, the government has prospects of developing its green industries and increase its global share of the clean energy market.

== Background ==
Government efforts to adapt environmentally-friendly energy systems began since the 1990s. The aftermath of the global recession in 2008 increased the awareness of energy self-sufficiency in the country which led to the Green Growth Agenda campaign under former President Lee Myung-Bak's administration. This agenda focused on three pillars: energy sufficiency, economic growth and environmental protection. In 2009 UN member states commenced at the United Nations Framework for Climate Change Conference and signed the Copenhagen Accord at which South Korea pledged to reduce its emissions by 30% of its projected business as usual scenario.

=== Copenhagen Accord ===
In 2009 member states commenced at the United Nations Framework for Climate Change Conference (UNFCCC) and signed the Copenhagen Accord. South Korea pledged to reduce its emissions by 30% of its projected business as usual scenario by the year 2020. There were two main motives behind this voluntary commitment. At the domestic level, former President Lee Myung-bak had pledged a 7% annual growth rate and a green economic agenda as part of his election campaign. The Lee administration considered the ETS as a viable mechanism for green growth and also increasing Korea's competitiveness in the global green market. At the international level, Korea was undergoing pressure from the international community to strengthen efforts against climate change. Since South Korea was not enlisted as an Annex I Country in the Kyoto Protocol, it had been exempt from emission reduction obligations. However, considering the size of its economy and its high position on emission rankings, the country could not avoid international pressure for stronger commitment. The voluntary pledge at Copenhagen received critical views at home. The feasibility of establishing a legally binding system of emissions reduction and the potential for cultivation the green sector as an economic growth engine were put into question.

=== The Framework Act on Low Carbon, Green Growth ===
Also referred to as the Framework Act, this set the legal groundwork of the emissions trading scheme since 2010. Article 46 clause 1 states "The Government may operate a system for trading emissions of greenhouse gases by utilizing market functions in order to accomplish its target of reduction of greenhouse gases."

=== Target Management System ===
Under provisions of Article 42, the Framework Act introduced the Target Management System (TMS) in 2012 which served as a transitional step before implementing the emissions trading scheme. Business entities subject under the TMS were obligated to reduce both direct and indirect GHG emissions under the supervision of the Ministry of Environment. The key difference between of the TMS from the ETS was that it lacked a market-function and there were no incentives for compliance. It served a vital role in collecting emissions data and strengthening the foundations of the ETS.

=== National Emissions Permit Allocation Plan ===
The Ministry of Environment was appointed to devise the allocation plan specifying the following elements:

- Total amount of emission permits to be issued for each phase
- Standard for distributing allowances in each sector
- Type of business entities involved
- Criteria and incentives for early emission reduction among participants
- Banking and borrowing of permits and offsets.

The Allocation Plan focused on the outline and execution of the ETS while a separate Master Plan was devised to incorporate the ETS with other abatement policies.

=== Timeline of the Workings and Implementation of KETS ===
- 2010: At the Climate Conference in Copenhagen, South Korea pledges to reduce its GHG emissions 30% below its BAU level by 2020.
- 2012: The Act on the Allocation and Trading of Greenhouse Gas Emission Permits (ETS Act) and Enforcement Decree are legislated.
- 2014:
  - January - The South Korean government appoints Korea Exchange (KEX) to oversee the exchange of emission permits. The Ministry of Strategy and Finance (MOSF) releases the first Master Plan, outlining the legal execution of the Allocation plan during the first commitment phase of 2015–2017
  - June: The Ministry of Environment (MOE) releases National Emissions Permit Allocation Plan including details of operation during Phase 1 and total number of allowances to be circulated with their allocation method.
  - September: Government holds first meeting of Emission Permits Allocation Committee (EPAC) revising and approving the Allocation Plan. The plan is finalized and ready for execution.
- 2015: Emissions Trading Scheme is officially launched in January.

== Mechanism ==
To accomplish its Copenhagen pledge, South Korea is restrained from producing more than 543 million tCO_{2}e by 2020. According to varying calculation methods of business as usual scenarios, this can indicate 233.1 million tCO_{2}e or more. Six greenhouse gases are covered in the scheme: carbon dioxide, methane, nitrous oxide, hydrofluorocarbons, perfluorocarbons, and sulfur hexafluoride. More than 525 business entities are subject to the ETS with specific emission targets set for each sectors.

Similar to that of the European Union, South Korea has divided its emissions trading scheme into three phases. With differing time spans and targets within each phase. The country is currently in its first phase which started in 2015 and lasts until 2017. The second phase occupies a three-year span from 2018 to 2020 and the final third phase is from 2021 to 2025.

=== Allocation of carbon allowances ===
During Phase 1 all permits were allocated freely without the employment of the auction system. Three sectors including grey clinker, oil refinery and aviation received free allowances based on data analysis of previous activity. A reserve was maintain approximately 5% of the total allowances for purposes of market stabilization or accepting new entrants. Any surplus of allowances not allocated to specific entities were also kept in the reserve.

In the second phase from 2018 to 2020, 97% of the permits were freely allocated and 3% auctioned. In the third and final five-year period between 2021 and 2025 less than 90% had go under free allocation and the rest was being auctioned. To lessen the burden of particular businesses those involved in energy-intensive and trade-exposed sectors (EITE) was granted 100% of their allowances for free in all three phases.

=== Compliance measures ===
The Certification Committee of the Ministry of Environment holds supervisory authority to review the annual emissions reports and the emissions was verified by a third-party. Penalty for exceeding the cap was less than triple of the average market price for allowances in the compliance year. Participating facilities are required to create a yearly emission inventory verified by a third party which was reported to the government. This reports was enlisted in the Emission Trading Registry System (ETRS).

== Implementation of Phase 1 ==
=== Immediate Results ===
Among the 525+ business entities that were subject to the newly introduced emissions trading scheme in South Korea more than 500 were able to achieve their targets by the deadline of June 30, 2015.

=== Opposition ===
The scheme has faced significant opposition from the start. The Federation of Korean Industries filed and the Korea Chamber of Commerce filed a report demanding the postponement of the implementation year from 2013 to 2015. They expressed their concerns of losing global competitiveness due to an increase in their production costs. Furthermore, more than 40 lawsuits were filed against the government in regards to the problem of permit allocation. Sub-industry groups such as petrochemicals and non-ferrous producers voiced out their complaint that the government did not sufficiently allocate permits and lacked proper explanation of the unequal distribution.
