= Filip Palda =

Filip Palda (May 12, 1962 – August 24, 2017) was a full professor in Economics at the École nationale d’administration publique (ENAP) and a Senior Fellow at the Fraser Institute. He held a master's degree from Queen's University and a Ph.D. in economics from the University of Chicago, where he studied under Gary S. Becker (Nobel prize in Economics).

His research interests included cost-benefit analysis, tax analysis, Public Choice, the underground economy, and the effects of electoral rules on political competition.

== Publications ==
The complete archive of Filip Palda's publications is available on the ENAP's website: http://enap.uquebec.ca/enap-fra/bibliotheque/pub-personnel/publi-palda-filip.html

His published books are:

- A Better Kind of Violence:Chicago Political Economy, Public Choice, and the Quest for an Ultimate Theory of Power. Ottawa, Canada., Cooper-Wolfling, 2016. 132 p. http://www.coopwolf.com
- The Apprentice Economist: Seven Steps to Mastery. Ottawa, Canada., Cooper-Wolfling, 2013. 291 p. http://www.apprentecon.com
- Pareto's Republic and the New Science of Peace. Ottawa, Canada., Cooper-Wolfling, 2011. 128 p. http://www.paretorepublic.com
- Tax Evasion and Firm Survival in Competitive Markets. Cheltenham, G.-B., Edward Elgar, 2001. 144 p.
- PALDA, Filip and BOUCHER, Michel. Ici le peuple gouverne : pour une réforme de la démocratie. Montréal, Varia, 2000. 272 p.
- Home on the Urban Range : An Idea Map for Reforming the City. Vancouver, Fraser Institute, 1998. 117 p.
- Here the People Rule : A Toolbook for Reforming Democracy. St. Paul, Minn., Professors World Peace Academy, 1997. 195 p.
- PALDA, Filip, HORRY, Isabella and WALKER, Michael. Tax facts 10. Vancouver, Fraser Institute, 1997. 155 p.
- Essays in Canadian Surface Transportation. Vancouver, Fraser Institute, 1995. 178 p.
- It's No Gamble : The Economic and Social Benefits of Stock Markets. Vancouver, Fraser Institute, 1995. 173 p.
- L'État interventionniste : le gouvernement provincial et l'économie du Québec. Vancouver, Fraser Institute, 1994. 216 p.
- How Much Is Your Vote Worth? : The Unfairness of Campaign Spending Limits. San Francisco, Cal., ICS Press, 1994. 143 p.
- Provincial Trade Wars : Why the Blockade Must End. Vancouver, Fraser Institute, 1994. 170 p.
- PALDA, Filip, HORRY, Isabella and WALKER, Michael. Tax Facts 9. Vancouver, Fraser Institute, 1994. 156 p.
- PALDA, Filip (adaptation) and TULLOCK, Gordon. The New Federalist. Vancouver, Fraser Institute, 1994. 141 p. (Adapted for Canada by Filip Palda).
- PALDA, Filip, HORRY, Isabella and WALKER, Michael. Tax facts 8. Vancouver, Fraser Institute, 1992. 151 p.
- Election Finance Regulation in Canada : A Critical Review. Vancouver, Fraser Institute, 1991. 132 p.

== Other external links ==
- Filip Palda's page on ENAP's website: http://enap.uquebec.ca/enap/2890/Informations_professionnelles.enap?view=fonction&indid=447%5B‍%5D
- Fraser Institute: http://www.fraserinstitute.org/
