= Integrated Global System Model =

The Integrated Global System Model (IGSM) is an Integrated Assessment Model (IAM) developed by the Massachusetts Institute of Technology (MIT) Joint Program on the Science and Policy of Global Change. The IGSM couples the MIT Earth System Model (MESM), an Earth system model of intermediate complexity, to the Economic Projection and Policy Analysis (EPPA), a human activity model that represents the world's economy. It has been used to understand the interactions between humans and the global climate system.

== History ==
IGSM was introduced in 1999 in a paper by Ronald Prinn et al. in a paper in Climatic Change Version 2 was released in 2005.

== Reception ==
=== Academic reception ===
The IGSM has been referenced by the United States Environmental Protection Agency and the Intergovernmental Panel on Climate Change.

The IGSM has also been referenced in academic literature on climate systems, human activity, and policy implications. Version 1 was used by the model creators for an analysis of the Kyoto Protocol in a 1999 paper for Nature. Version 2.2 was used by the creators of the model in a study published as a working paper in 2008. A modified version was published in Climatic Change in 2011. A 2012 working paper did an analysis of climate policy targets under uncertainty. The strategy for investigating the impacts of climate change on Earth's physical, biological and human resources and links to their socio-economic consequences in the MIT IGSM is discussed in an article published in Climatic Change in 2013. A demonstration of the IGSM capabilities for multi-sectoral assessment of climate impacts under a range of consistent and integrated economic and climate scenarios that are responsive to new policies and business expectations was published in Nature Communications in 2018.

Independent authors have also referenced the IGSM.

== See also ==
- DICE model
