= Carbon budget =

Limit on carbon dioxide emission for a given climate impact

This figure depicts the rates at which global CO_{2} emissions must decline after 2024 to limit the global temperature increase to 1.5, 1.7, or 2.0 degrees Celsius without relying on net-negative emissions.

A carbon budget is a concept used in politics of climate change to help set greenhouse gas emissions reduction targets in a fair and effective way. It examines the "maximum amount of cumulative net global anthropogenic carbon dioxide (CO_{2}) emissions that would result in limiting global warming to a given level". It can be expressed relative to the pre-industrial period (the year 1750). In this case, it is the total carbon budget. Or it can be expressed from a recent specified date onwards. In that case it is the remaining carbon budget.

A carbon budget that will keep global warming below a specified temperature limit is also called an emissions budget or quota, or allowable emissions. Apart from limiting the global temperature increase, another objective of such an emissions budget can be to limit sea level rise.

Scientists combine estimates of various contributing factors to calculate the carbon budget. The estimates take into account the available scientific evidence as well as value judgments or choices.

Global carbon budgets can be further sub-divided into national emissions budgets. This can help countries set their own emission goals. Emissions budgets indicate a finite amount of carbon dioxide that can be emitted over time, before resulting in dangerous levels of global warming. The change in global temperature is independent of the source of these emissions, and is largely independent of the timing of these emissions.

To translate global carbon budgets to the country level, a set of value judgments have to be made on how to distribute the remaining carbon budget over all the different countries. This should take into account aspects of equity and fairness between countries as well as other methodological choices. There are many differences between nations, such as population size, level of industrialisation, historic emissions, and mitigation capabilities. For this reason, scientists are attempting to allocate global carbon budgets among countries using various principles of equity.

== Definition ==
The IPCC Sixth Assessment Reports defines carbon budget as the following two concepts:

- "An assessment of carbon cycle sources and sinks on a global level, through the synthesis of evidence for fossil fuel and cement emissions, emissions and removals associated with land use and land-use change, ocean and natural land sources and sinks of carbon dioxide (CO_{2}), and the resulting change in atmospheric CO_{2} concentration. This is referred to as the global carbon budget."; or
- "The maximum amount of cumulative net global anthropogenic CO_{2} emissions that would result in limiting global warming to a given level with a given probability, taking into account the effect of other anthropogenic climate forcers. This is referred to as the total carbon budget when expressed starting from the pre-industrial period, and as the remaining carbon budget when expressed from a recent specified date."

Global carbon budgets can be further divided into national emissions budgets, so that countries can set specific climate mitigation goals.

An emissions budget may be distinguished from an emissions target, as an emissions target may be internationally or nationally set in accordance with objectives other than a specific global temperature and are commonly applied to the annual emissions in a single year as well.

== Estimations ==
=== Recent and currently remaining carbon budget ===
Historical (unrestrained) carbon budget: Cumulative contributions to the global carbon budget since 1850 illustrate how source and sink components have been out of balance, causing an approximately 50% rise in atmospheric CO_{2}.

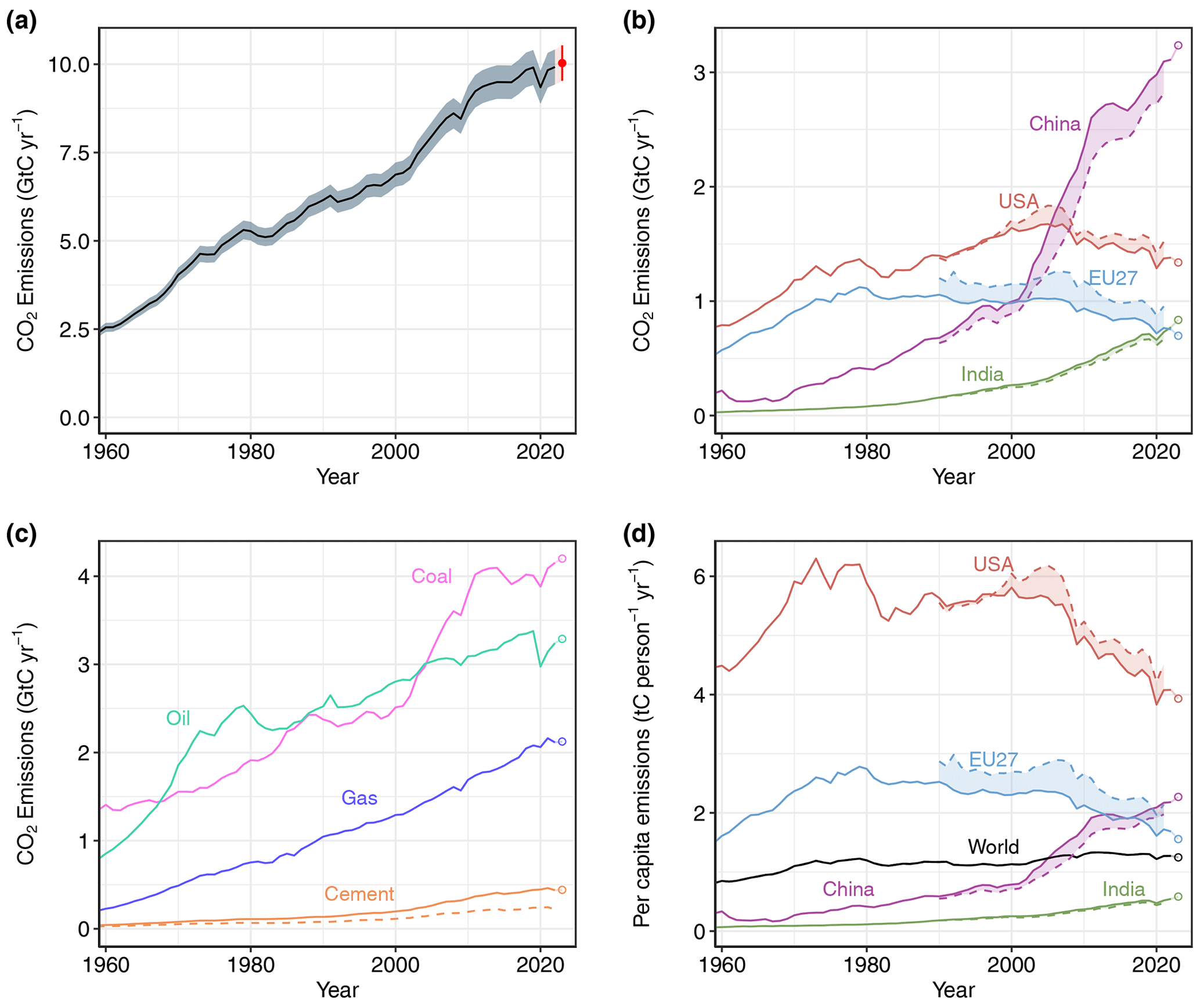
Fossil CO_{2} emissions: global; territorial; by fuel type (incl cement); per capita

Several organisations provide annual updates to the remaining carbon budget, including the Global Carbon Project, the Mercator Research Institute on Global Commons and Climate Change (MCC) and the CONSTRAIN project. In March 2022, before formal publication of the "Global Carbon Budget 2021" preprint, scientists reported, based on Carbon Monitor (CM) data, that after COVID-19-pandemic-caused record-level declines in 2020, global CO_{2} emissions rebounded sharply by 4.8% in 2021, indicating that at the current trajectory, the carbon budget for a 2/3 likelihood for limiting warming to 1.5 °C would be used up within 9.5 years.

In April 2022, the now reviewed and officially published The Global Carbon Budget 2021 concluded that fossil CO_{2} emissions rebounded from pandemic levels by around +4.8% relative to 2020 emissions – returning to 2019 levels.

It identifies three major issues for improving reliable accuracy of monitoring, shows that China and India surpassed 2019 levels (by 5.7% and 3.2%) while the EU and the US stayed beneath 2019 levels (by 5.3% and 4.5%), quantifies various changes and trends, for the first time provides models' estimates that are linked to the official country GHG inventories reporting, and suggests that the remaining carbon budget at 1. Jan 2022 for a 50% likelihood to limit global warming to 1.5 °C (albeit a temporary exceedence is to be expected) is 120 GtC (420 GtCO_{2}) – or 11 years of 2021 emissions levels.

This does not mean that likely 11 years remain to cut emissions but that if emissions stayed the same, instead of increasing like in 2021, 11 years of constant GHG emissions would be left in the hypothetical scenario that all emissions suddenly ceased in the 12th year. (The 50% likelihood may be describable as a kind of minimum plausible deniability requirement as lower likelihoods would make the 1.5 °C goal "unlikely".) Moreover, other trackers show (or highlight) different amounts of carbon budget left, such as the MCC, which as of May 2022 shows "7 years 1 month left" and different likelihoods have different carbon budgets: an 83% likelihood would mean 6.6 ±0.1 years left (ending in 2028) according to CM data.

In October 2023 a group of researchers updated the carbon budget including the CO_{2} emitted at 2020-2022 and new findings about the role of reduced presence of polluting particles in the atmosphere. They found we can emit 250 GtCO_{2} or 6 years of emissions at current level starting from January 2023, for having a 50% chance to stay below 1.5 degrees. For reaching this target humanity will need to zero CO_{2} emissions by the year 2034. To have a 50% chance of staying below 2 degrees humanity can emit 1220 GtCO_{2} or 30 years of emissions at current level.

=== Carbon budget in gigatonnes and factors ===
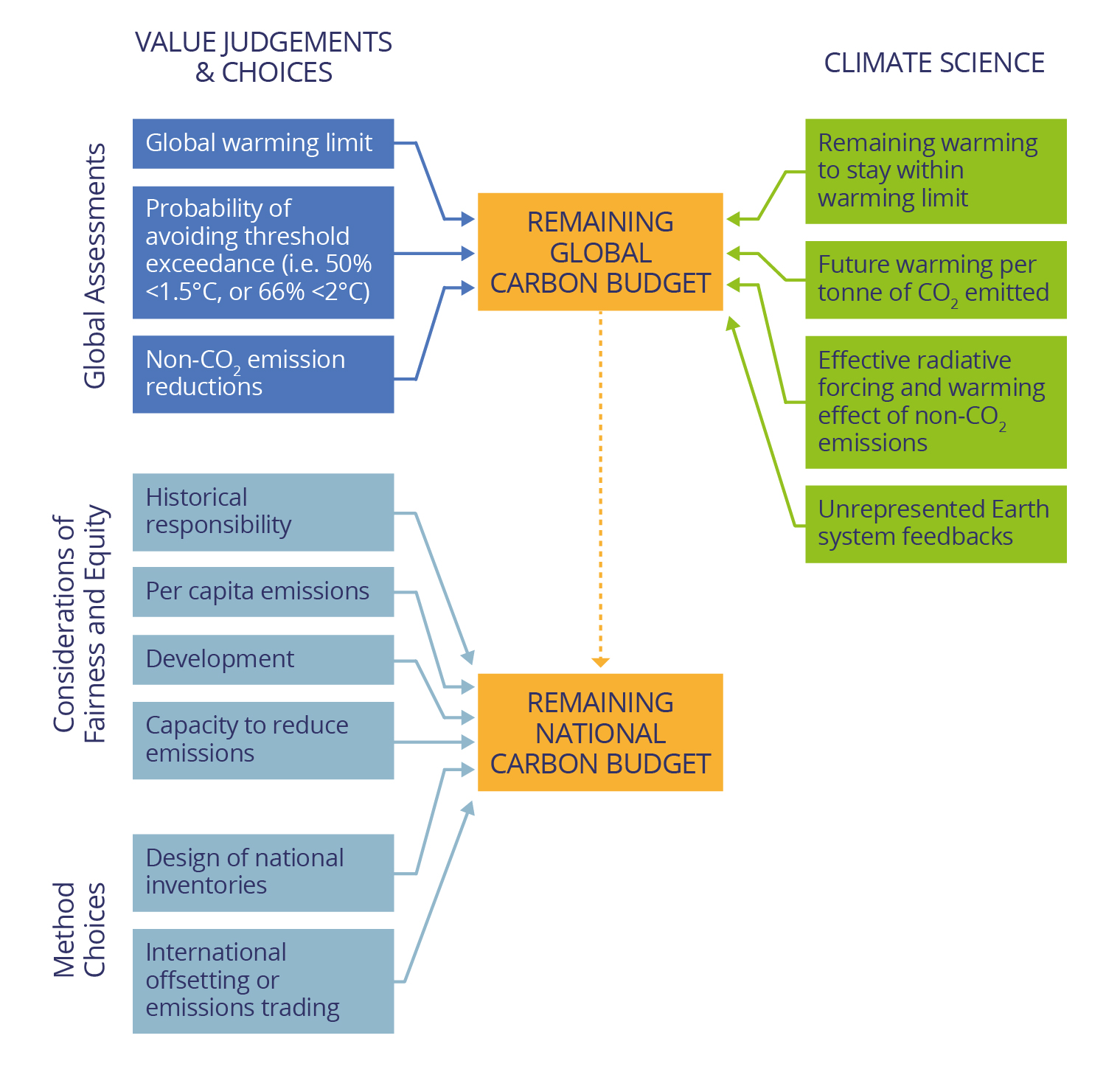
Estimating the remaining carbon budget at the global level depends on climate science and value judgments or choices. To translate a global budget to the national level, further value judgments and choices have to be made.

The finding of an almost linear relationship between global temperature rise and cumulative carbon dioxide emissions has encouraged the estimation of global emissions budgets in order to remain below dangerous levels of warming. Since the pre-industrial period (year 1750) to 2019, approximately 2390 Gigatonnes of CO_{2} (Gt CO_{2}) has already been emitted globally.

Scientific estimations of the remaining global emissions budgets/quotas differ due to varied methodological approaches, and considerations of thresholds. Estimations might not include all amplifying climate change feedbacks, although the most authoritative carbon budget assessments as summarised by the IPCC do account explicitly for these. Scientists assess the size of remaining carbon budgets using estimates of:

- past warming caused by human activities,
- the amount of warming per cumulative unit of CO_{2} emissions (also known as the Transient Climate Response to cumulative Emissions of carbon dioxide, or TCRE),
- the amount of warming that could still occur once all emissions of CO_{2} are halted (known as the Zero Emissions Commitment), and
- the impact of Earth system feedbacks that would otherwise not be covered.

The estimates vary according to the global temperature target that is chosen, the probability of staying below that target, and the emission of other non-CO_{2} greenhouse gases (GHGs). This approach was first applied in the 2018 Special report on Global Warming of 1.5 °C by the IPCC, and was also used in its 2021 Working Group I Contribution to the Sixth Assessment Report.

Carbon budget estimates depend on the likelihood or probability of avoiding a temperature limit, and the assumed warming that is projected to be caused by non-CO_{2} emissions. These estimates assume non-CO_{2} emissions are also reduced in line with deep decarbonisation scenarios that reach global net zero CO_{2} emissions. Carbon budget estimates thus depend on how successful society is in reducing non-CO_{2} emissions together with carbon dioxide emissions. Scientists estimated that remaining carbon budgets can be 220 Gt CO_{2} higher or lower depending on how successful non-CO_{2} emissions are reduced.

Estimated carbon budgets in GtCO_{2} from 2020 with likelihoods
Global warming relative to 1850–1900	17%	33%	50%	66%	83%
1.5 °C	900	650	500	400	300
1.7 °C	1450	1050	850	700	550
2.0 °C	2300	1700	1350	1150	900

== Pathways to stay within carbon budget ==
Climate change mitigation, also called decarbonisation, is an action to limit the greenhouse gases in the atmosphere that cause climate change. Climate change mitigation actions include conserving energy and replacing fossil fuels with clean energy sources. Secondary mitigation strategies include changes to land use and removing carbon dioxide (CO_{2}) from the atmosphere. 2022 assessments emphasize that global greenhouse gas emissions must peak before 2025 and decline by about 43% by 2030 to limit warming to 1.5 °C, requiring rapid transitions in energy, transport, and land-use systems.

=== National emissions budgets ===
Carbon budgets are applicable to the global level. To translate these global carbon budgets to the country level, a set of value judgments have to be made on how to distribute the total and remaining carbon budget. In light of the many differences between nations, including but not limited to population, level of industrialisation, national emissions histories, and mitigation capabilities, scientists have made attempts to allocate global carbon budgets among countries using methods that follow various principles of equity. Allocating national emissions budgets is comparable to sharing the effort to reduce global emissions, underlined by some assumptions of state-level responsibility of climate change. Many authors have conducted quantitative analyses which allocate emissions budgets, often simultaneously addressing disparities in historical GHG emissions between nations.

One guiding principle that is used to allocate global emissions budgets to nations is the principle of "common but differentiated responsibilities and respective capabilities" that is included in the United Nations Framework Convention on Climate Change (UNFCCC). This principle is not defined in further detail in the UNFCCC but is broadly understood to recognize nations' different cumulative historical contributions to global emissions as well as their different development stages. From this perspective, those countries with greater emissions during a set time period (for example, since the pre-industrial era to the present) are the most responsible for addressing excess emissions, as are countries that are richer. Thus, their national emissions budgets have to be smaller than those from countries that have polluted less in the past, or are poorer. The concept of national historical responsibility for climate change has prevailed in the literature since the early 1990s and has been part of the key international agreements on climate change (UNFCCC, the Kyoto Protocol and the Paris Agreement). Consequently, those countries with the highest cumulative historical emissions have the most responsibility to take the strongest actions and help developing countries to mitigate their emissions and adapt to climate change. This principle is recognized in international treaties and has been part of the diplomatic strategies by developing countries, that argue that they need larger emissions budgets to reduce inequity and achieve sustainable development.

Another common equity principle for calculating national emissions budgets is the "egalitarian" principle. This principle stipulates individuals should have equal rights, and therefore emissions budgets should be distributed proportionally according to state populations. Some scientists have thus reasoned the use of national per-capita emissions in national emissions budget calculations. This principle may be favoured by nations with larger or rapidly growing populations, but raises the question whether individuals can have a right to pollute.

A third equity principle that has been employed in national budget calculations considers national sovereignty. The "sovereignty" principle highlights the equal right of nations to pollute. The grandfathering method for calculating national emissions budgets uses this principle. Grandfathering allocates these budgets proportionally according to emissions at a particular base year, and has been used under international regimes such as the Kyoto Protocol and the early phase of the European Union Emissions Trading Scheme (EU ETS) This principle is often favoured by developed countries, as it allocates larger emissions budgets to them. However, recent publications highlight that grandfathering is unsupported as an equity principle as it "creates 'cascading biases' against poorer states, is not a 'standard of equity'". Other scholars have highlighted that "to treat states as the owners of emission rights has morally problematic consequences".

== See also ==
- Carbon price
- Economic analysis of climate change
- Global Carbon Project
