= Kazakhstan Emissions Trading System =

Market in Kazakhstan for greenhouse gas emissions

The Kazakhstan Emissions Trading System is the carbon emission trading system of Kazakhstan. It started in 2013. It has been criticised for having excessive free quotas.
