= Transient climate response =

How much global warming depends on atmospheric carbon dioxide

The transient climate response to cumulative emissions of carbon dioxide (TCRE) is the ratio of the globally averaged surface temperature change per unit carbon dioxide (CO_{2}) emitted. It should not be confused with Transient Climate Response (TCR), which is the temporary warming experienced when the CO2 concentration of the atmosphere has doubled in an idealised 1% per year increase experiment. As emitted CO_{2} may stay in the atmosphere for thousands of years, this response is the amount that the global temperature changes per the net amount of total carbon dioxide emitted by human activities into the atmosphere. Scientists agree that global temperature changes linearly regardless of the path taken to reach peak cumulative CO_{2} emissions. This means that for specific amount of cumulative CO_{2} emissions, a known global temperature change (within a range of uncertainty) can be expected, which indicates that holding global temperature change to below specific thresholds is a problem of limiting cumulative CO_{2} emissions, leading to the idea of a carbon budget.

== Calculation ==
=== Formulas ===
The TCRE can be calculated based on a formula for the ratio of temperature change to cumulative carbon emissions (measured as CO_{2}), which is the net carbon remaining in the atmosphere after accounting for relevant sources and sinks. As a measure of atmospheric carbon change, the TCRE parameterizes how sensitive the climate is to carbon dioxide to formulate a value that is the temperature change (°C) per trillion tonnes of carbon emitted (Tt C). This is represented via the following formula:

$TCRE = \bigtriangleup T/E_T = (\bigtriangleup T/\bigtriangleup C_A)\times(\bigtriangleup C_A/E_T)$

where,

- ΔT = average global temperature change (°C)
- E_{T} = cumulative carbon dioxide emissions (Tt C)
- ΔC_{A} = change in atmospheric carbon (Tt C)

and, 1Tt C = 3.8 Tt CO_{2}

TCRE can also be defined not in terms of temperature response to emitted carbon, but in terms of temperature response to the change in radiative forcing:

$TCRE = \bigtriangleup T/ RF$

where,

- RF = radiative forcing (W/m^{2}) taken at the top of the atmosphere (TOA)

Here TCRE is used to assess the assumed linear effect radiative forcing has on temperature change in an historical analysis.

=== Modeling ===
TCRE is modeled using climate models that simulate carbon emissions by increasing CO_{2} emissions by 1% per year from pre-industrial levels until the concentration of CO_{2} in the atmosphere is doubled (2 x CO_{2}) or quadrupled (4 x CO_{2}). Since these experiments all start from the same initial atmospheric concentration of CO_{2} (around 285 ppm), the doubling and quadrupling occur at 70 and 140 years respectively. Different modelling parameterizations of TCRE include: holding CO_{2} emissions constant after quadrupling; modelling net negative emissions after doubling or quadrupling; stopping emissions after doubling and continuing the model for up to 10,000 years; or running extended RCP scenarios and assessing temperature change per cumulative emissions at high CO_{2} concentrations.

== Temperature Response ==
=== Global response ===
Global temperature change is approximately linearly proportional to cumulative carbon emissions. This means that for a given amount of carbon emissions, a related amount of global warming can reasonably be expected. The IPCC Sixth Assessment Report, which is the most thorough estimate as of 2021, suggests a likely TCRE of 1.0 °C–2.3 °C per Tt C (or 1000 Pg C), a narrowing of the 0.8° to 2.5 °C per Tt C range estimated by the IPCC in 2013.

=== Regional response ===
Though the global average temperature response to cumulative emissions is approximately linear, this response is not uniform throughout the globe. Calculations by Leduc et al., (2016) of the geographical pattern of temperature response (the regional TCRE, or RTCRE) show values of low temperature change over equatorial and tropical ocean regions and high values of temperature change exceeding 4 °C/Tt C in the Arctic. Likewise, they show a pronounced temperature response difference between the land and ocean, which is largely because the ocean absorbs much of the heat.

==== Regional precipitation response ====
Unlike the positive regional temperature response, regional precipitation changes to cumulative emissions are positive or negative, depending on location. Partanen et al., (2017) show a strong positive precipitation response in the Arctic with negative responses (meaning reduced precipitation) in parts of Southern Africa, Australia, North and South America.

== Carbon budget ==
The observed and calculated linear TCRE leads to the notion of a carbon budget. A carbon budget is "the maximum amount of cumulative net global anthropogenic carbon dioxide (CO_{2}) emissions that would result in limiting global warming to a given level with a given probability, taking into account the effect of other anthropogenic climate forcers".

== See also ==
- Climate sensitivity
- Global warming
