= Criticism of the IPCC Fourth Assessment Report =

The IPCC Fourth Assessment Report (AR4) is a report on climate change created with the help of a large number of contributors, both scientists and governmental representatives. There has been considerable political controversy over errors found in the report, and there have been calls for review of the process used to formulate the report.

== Content issues ==
Some observers have identified issues in which the peer-reviewed science suggests outcomes more severe than outlined by the report, while other observers have said that some conclusions in the report are not satisfactorily supported by the peer-reviewed science. The Intergovernmental Panel on Climate Change (IPCC) have acknowledged that a paragraph in the WGII report on the projected date of melting of Himalayan glaciers is incorrect. Climate expert Martin Parry, who had been co-chair of the working group on impacts for IPCC AR4, stated that "What began with a single unfortunate error over Himalayan glaciers has become a clamour without substance". The IPCC had investigated other alleged mistakes, which were "generally unfounded and also marginal to the assessment", and were commonly based on the idea that the IPCC should not use grey literature, such as reports from campaign groups and governments.

=== Arctic sea ice extent ===
According to a study conducted by the National Center for Atmospheric Research and the National Snow and Ice Data Center, Arctic Sea ice is melting faster than predicted by climate models. The study concludes that the 18 models on which the IPCC has based its current recommendations could already be out of date, and that the retreat of the ice could already be 30 years ahead of the IPCC's worst-case scenario, possibly leading to an ice-free summer Arctic before the end of the 21st century.

=== Glacial dynamics ===
The IPCC AR4 estimates explicitly exclude the influence of the melting of ice sheets. These ice sheets include most notably the Greenland ice sheet, and both the east and west Antarctic ice sheets, as well as numerous glaciers. This may result in a major underestimate of the upper limit for sea level rise in the long term. Due to Arctic melting the Greenland ice sheet is particularly vulnerable, and a study by climatologist James E. Hansen states that "we cannot rule out large changes on decadal time-scales once wide-scale surface melt is underway." The melting of the Greenland ice sheet would result in an increase in sea level rise of over 7m. Melting of the west Antarctic ice sheet would cause a similar, if slightly smaller rise in sea levels due to being grounded below sea level, whilst the effect of the melting of the east Antarctic, although less probable would be an order of magnitude greater.

In a lecture he gave at the University of California, Santa Barbara, James E. Hansen criticised the IPCC for its description of future sea level rise. Hansen has also written on this issue:

The IPCC [Working Group I] (2007) midrange projection for sea level rise this century is 20–43 cm (8–17 inches) and its full range is 18–59 cm (7–23 inches). The IPCC notes that they are unable to evaluate possible dynamical responses of the ice sheets, and thus do not include any possible 'rapid dynamical changes in ice flow'. Yet the provision of such specific numbers for sea level rise encourages a predictable public response that the projected sea level change is moderate, and smaller than in IPCC (2001). Indeed, there have been numerous media reports of 'reduced' sea level rise predictions, and commentators have denigrated suggestions that business-as-usual greenhouse gas emissions may cause a sea level rise of the order of meters

... The IPCC is doing a commendable job, but we need something more. Given the reticence that the IPCC necessarily exhibits, there need to be supplementary mechanisms. The onus, it seems to me, falls on us scientists as a community.

In a lecture given at Princeton University, IPCC author Michael Oppenheimer admitted that the IPCC report could have better explained the contribution of melting ice sheets in predictions of sea level rise. Oppenheimer said that the IPCC Working Group II Summary for Policymakers (quoted below) managed this better than the Working Group I Summary for Policymakers:

There is medium confidence [about 5/10 chance of being correct] that at least partial deglaciation of the Greenland ice sheet, and possibly the West Antarctic ice sheet, would occur over a period of time ranging from centuries to millennia for a global average temperature increase of 1–4°C (relative to 1990–2000), causing a contribution to sea-level rise of 4–6 m or more.

=== Projected date of melting of Himalayan glaciers ===
A paragraph in the 938-page 2007 Working Group II report (WGII) included a projection that Himalayan glaciers could disappear by 2035. This projection was not included in the final summary for policymakers which highlighted the importance of the glaciers for freshwater availability, and stated that "Widespread mass losses from glaciers and reductions in snow cover over recent decades are projected to accelerate throughout the 21st century". Late in 2009, in the approach to the Copenhagen climate summit, the 2035 date was strongly questioned in India. On 19 January 2010 the IPCC acknowledged that the paragraph was incorrect, while reaffirming that the conclusion in the final summary was robust. They expressed regret for "the poor application of well-established IPCC procedures in this instance" and their vice-chairman Jean-Pascal van Ypersele said that the reviewing procedures would have to be tightened.

The WGII report ("Impacts, Adaptation and Vulnerability"), chapter 10, page 493, includes this paragraph:

Glaciers in the Himalaya are receding faster than in any other part of the world (see Table 10.9) and, if the present rate continues, the likelihood of them disappearing by the year 2035 and perhaps sooner is very high if the Earth keeps warming at the current rate. Its total area will likely shrink from the present 500,000 to 100,000 km^{2} by the year 2035 (WWF, 2005).

— WGII p. 493

There was controversy in India over this statement, and at the start of December 2009 J. Graham Cogley of Trent University, Ontario, described the paragraph as wildly inaccurate. The rates of recession of Himalayan glaciers were exceptional, but their disappearance by 2035 would require a huge acceleration in rate. The first sentence of the IPCC WGII report, including the date of 2035, came from the cited source, "(WWF, 2005)". This was a March 2005 World Wildlife Fund Nepal Program report, page 29:

In 1999, a report by the Working Group on Himalayan Glaciology (WGHG) of the International Commission for Snow and Ice (ICSI) stated: "glaciers in the Himalayas are receding faster than in any other part of the world and, if the present rate continues, the livelihood [sic] of them disappearing by the year 2035 is very high".

— WWF p. 29

On page 2, the WWF report cited an article in the 5 June 1999 issue of New Scientist which quoted Syed Hasnain, Chairman of the International Commission for Snow and Ice (ICSI), saying that most of the glaciers in the Himalayan region "will vanish within 40 years as a result of global warming". That article was based on an email interview, and says that "Hasnain's four-year study indicates that all the glaciers in the central and eastern Himalayas could disappear by 2035 at their present rate of decline." Both the article and the WWF report referred to Hasnain's unpublished 1999 ICSI study, Report on Himalayan Glaciology, which does not estimate a date for the disappearance of Himalayan glaciers.

The second sentence of the questionable WGII paragraph which states "Its total area will likely shrink from the present 500,000 to 100,000 km^{2} by the year 2035" could not refer to the Himalayan glaciers, which cover about 33,000 km^{2}. Cogley said that a bibliographic search indicated that it had been copied inaccurately from a 1996 International Hydrological Programme (IHP) report by Kotlyakov, published by UNESCO, which gave a rough estimate of shrinkage of the world's total area of glaciers and ice caps by 2350.

The extrapolar glaciation of the Earth will be decaying at rapid, catastrophic rates – its total area will shrink from 500,000 to 100,000 km² by the year 2350.

— IHP p. 66

Cogley suggested that the "2035" figure in the second sentence of the WGII paragraph was apparently a typographic error. He concluded, "This was a bad error. It was a really bad paragraph, and poses a legitimate question about how to improve IPCC's review process. It was not a conspiracy. The error does not compromise the IPCC Fourth Assessment, which for the most part was well reviewed and is highly accurate."

Statements very similar to those made in both sentences of the WGII paragraph appeared as two successive paragraphs in an April 1999 article in Down to Earth , published in the India Environment Portal (IEP). This included the substitution of 2035 for 2350 as stated in the IHP study. New Scientist has drawn attention to Hasnain's claim about the timing of glaciers disappearing:

"Glaciers in the Himalaya are receding faster than in any other part of the world and, if the present rate continues, the likelihood of them disappearing by the year 2035 is very high," says the International Commission for Snow and Ice (ICSI) in its recent study on Asian glaciers. "But if the Earth keeps getting warmer at the current rate, it might happen much sooner," says Syed Iqbal Hasnain of the School of Environmental Sciences, Jawaharlal Nehru University, New Delhi. Hasnain is also the chairperson of the Working Group on Himalayan Glaciology (WGHG), constituted in 1995 by the ICSI. "The glacier will be decaying at rapid, catastrophic rates. Its total area will shrink from the present 500,000 to 100,000 square km by the year 2035," says former icsi president V M Kotlyakov in the report Variations of snow and ice in the past and present on a global and regional scale (see table: Receding rivers of ice).

— IEP

The question of whether it was acceptable to use material which had not been peer reviewed has been disputed. IPCC rules permit the use of non-peer-reviewed material, subject to a procedure in which authors are to critically assess any source that they wish to include, and "each chapter team should review the quality and validity of each source before incorporating results from the source into an IPCC Report."

The official statement issued by the IPCC on 20 January 2010 noted that "a paragraph in the 938-page Working Group II contribution to the underlying assessment refers to poorly substantiated estimates of rate of recession and date for the disappearance of Himalayan glaciers. In drafting the paragraph in question, the clear and well-established standards of evidence, required by the IPCC procedures, were not applied properly." It emphasised that the paragraph did not affect the conclusion in the final summary for policymakers in the 2007 report, which it described as "robust, appropriate, and entirely consistent with the underlying science and the broader IPCC assessment", and reaffirmed a commitment to absolute adherence to the IPCC standards. The IPCC also stated that it did not change the broad picture of man-made climate change. This was confirmed by Wilfried Haeberli, who announced the latest annual results of the World Glacier Monitoring Service. He stated that the important trend of 10 years or so showed "an unbroken acceleration in melting" and on expected trends, many glaciers will disappear by mid century. Glaciers in lower mountain ranges were the most vulnerable, and while those in the Himalayas and Alaska could grow in the short term, in a realistic mid-range warming scenario they would not last many centuries. Mojib Latif, a climate scientist who contributed to the report of Working Group 1, sees the consequences of the glacier data mistake but also the need to continue focusing on global warming.

=== African crop yield projections ===
Chapter 9 of the Working Group II report states that "In other countries, additional risks that could be exacerbated by climate change include greater erosion, deficiencies in yields from rain-fed agriculture of up to 50% during the 2000–2020 period, and reductions in crop growth period (Agoumi, 2003)." This claim was also included in the AR4 Synthesis Report, and has been mentioned in speeches by IPCC Chairman Rajendra Pachauri and UN Secretary-General Ban Ki-moon. The source cited in the report for this claim is a non-peer reviewed policy paper published by International Institute for Sustainable Development, a Canadian think tank. Chris Field, the new lead author of the IPCC's climate impacts team, questioned the claim, telling the Sunday Times that "I was not an author on the Synthesis Report but on reading it I cannot find support for the statement about African crop yield declines". Former IPCC chairman Robert Watson said "Any such projection should be based on peer-reviewed literature from computer modelling of how agricultural yields would respond to climate change. I can see no such data supporting the IPCC report."

The United States Environmental Protection Agency used the IPCC report on this point, and received criticism that because of the nature of the source, they should not have done so. The EPA rebutted this criticism, noting that "The IPCC statement cites a report by Dr. Ali Agoumi... These vulnerability studies were prepared under the U.N. Environment Programme Global Environment Fund and included in the National Communications of these three countries to the U.N. Framework Convention on Climate Change (Ministry of Territory Development and Environment, 2001, Kingdom of Morocco, 2001 and Republic of Tunisia, 2001)... Dr. Coleen Vogel, a contributing lead author of the IPCC chapter on Africa impacts... explained that Agoumi's report received rigorous scrutiny by her fellow authors and was thoroughly discussed during development of the chapter... The process described by Dr. Vogel is consistent with the IPCC's guidance on the use of gray literature".

=== Proportion of Netherlands below sea level ===
The Working Group II: Impacts, Adaption and Vulnerability report states that "The Netherlands is an example of a country highly susceptible to both sea-level rise and river flooding because 55% of its territory is below sea level". This was based on data it had received from the Netherlands Environmental Assessment Agency (the PBL). When the Dutch government raised questions, the PBL acknowledged in a statement that it had supplied the incorrect wording to the IPCC, "This should have read that 55 per cent of the Netherlands is at risk of flooding; 26 per cent of the country is below sea level, and 29 per cent is susceptible to river flooding." It used Normaal Amsterdams Peil as the datum for sea level. Martin Parry, climate expert and co-chair of the IPCC working group II, said that various different figures could have been used, depending on how the issue was defined. A figure of 60%, for land that lies below high water level during storms, is used by the Dutch Ministry of Transport, while a figure of 30%, referring to land below mean sea level, is used by others.

De Volkskrant reported Mary Jean Burer, a spokesperson for the Netherlands Environmental Assessment Agency (PBL) as saying that the confusion can partly be blamed on several EU articles by the Transport Ministry in which numbers like 55 and 60 percent land area are mixed up. "Sometimes it refers to floods, sometimes the sea level". PBL employee Oude Lohuis added that the IPCC cannot be blamed for the fact that the statement of 55% being below sea level was not noticed. "The ministry says in some brochures that during spring tides the Netherlands is 60 % below sea level", he said, "So for outsiders it's not a strange number"

== Process issues ==
Richard Black, an environmental reporter for the BBC, once observed that the IPCC is an unusual organisation in that the evidence is supplied by scientists, but the summaries of its reports are agreed between scientists and representatives of governments.

=== Dismissal of concerns ===
In January 2005, Chris Landsea who had been an author on the 2001 report (TAR), withdrew his participation in the Fourth Assessment Report claiming that the portion of the IPCC to which he contributed had become "politicized" and that the IPCC leadership simply dismissed his concerns. He published an open letter explaining why he was resigning and to "bring awareness to what I view as a problem in the IPCC process".

Landsea alleged that lead author Kevin Trenberth had told a press conference that global warming was contributing to "recent hurricane activity", which Landsea described as a "misrepresentation of climate science while invoking the authority of the IPCC". He said that the process of producing the Fourth Assessment Report is "motivated by pre-conceived agendas" and "scientifically unsound". Landsea wrote that "the IPCC leadership said that Dr. Trenberth was speaking as an individual even though he was introduced in the press conference as an IPCC lead author."

=== Aerosol forcing uncertainty ===
The 2007 IPCC Working Group I Report quantified the effect of anthropogenic aerosols on the climate in terms of their radiative forcing. Radiative forcing measures the influence a particular factor has on changing the Earth-atmosphere-system energy balance. The effect of aerosols was assessed to be the dominant uncertainty in radiative forcing.

A 2008 Report for the US Climate Change Science Program (CCSP) suggested that the IPCC report may have been 'overconfident' with its uncertainty estimate for the total aerosol forcing. This was based on an earlier 2006 paper that elicitated the judgment of twenty-four experts on aerosol forcing. The CCSP Report went on to say:

... expert judgment is not a substitute for definitive scientific research. Nor is it a substitute for careful deliberative expert reviews of the literature of the sort undertaken by the IPCC. However, its use within such review processes could enable a better expression of the diversity of expert judgment and allow more formal expression of expert judgments, which are not adequately reflected, in the existing literature. It can also provide insights for policy makers and research planners while research to produce more definitive results is ongoing. It is for these reasons that Moss and Schneider have argued that such elicitations should become a standard input to the IPCC assessment process

=== Recommended procedural change ===
In 2007, economist and former IPCC author Richard Tol wrote a paper on the IPCC Working Group III Report. Tol said that the quality of the Working Group III Report had declined. He made several criticisms of the Report's content, and suggested changes in procedure that could improve the quality of future IPCC assessments:

It would be much better to shift the IPCC from UNEP and the environment ministries to ICSU and the ministries of research and higher education. Academic quality should be guiding principle in selecting authors. As a check, the committees that nominate and select authors should publish their proceedings. The review editors should become more independent, and gain the right to reject chapters that are not properly revised. The alternative is a gradual erosion of the quality, prestige and, eventually, influence of the IPCC.

In February 2010, in response to controversies regarding claims in the Fourth Assessment Report, five climate scientists – all contributing or lead IPCC report authors – wrote in the journal Nature calling for changes to the IPCC. They suggested a range of new organizational options, from tightening the selection of lead authors and contributors, to dumping it in favor of a small permanent body, or even turning the whole climate science assessment process into a moderated "living" Wikipedia-IPCC. Other recommendations included that the panel employ a full-time staff and remove government oversight from its processes to avoid political interference.

=== Grey literature ===
The report was also criticized by The Sunday Telegraph for using grey literature. Examples they gave included the use of non-peer reviewed sources from the International Union for Conservation of Nature and the World Wildlife Fund, and student dissertations. IPCC rules permit the use of non-peer-reviewed material, subject to critical assessment and review of the quality and validity of each source. Climate expert Martin Parry, who had been co-chair of the working group on impacts for IPCC AR4, said of "grey literature" such as reports from campaign groups and governments that "many such reports are intensively reviewed, both internally and externally. Even if not peer-reviewed, there are reports that contain valuable information."

== Response to criticisms ==
The focus by the media on errors found in the Fourth Assessment Report resulted in a number of responses from the scientific community.

In February 2010 the International Council for Science (ICSU) released a statement indicating that "in proportion to the sheer volume of the research reviewed and analyzed, these lapses of accuracy are minor and they in no way undermine the main conclusions" and "That these errors have resulted in attempts to discredit the main conclusions of the report, accusations of scientific conspiracies, and personal attacks on scientists is unacceptable".

On March 12, 2010, an open letter was released signed by Gary Yohe, Stephen Schneider and Cynthia E. Rosenzweig along with 249 other scientists, the vast majority of whom were climate change scientists working at leading U.S. universities, including both IPCC and non-IPCC authors. The opening of the letter stated:

Many in the popular press and other media, as well as some in the halls of Congress, are seizing on a few errors that have been found in the Fourth Assessment Report (AR4) of the Intergovernmental Panel on Climate Change (IPCC) in an attempt to discredit the entire report. None of the handful of mis-statements (out of hundreds and hundreds of unchallenged statements) remotely undermines the conclusion that "warming of the climate system is unequivocal" and that most of the observed increase in global average temperatures since the mid-twentieth century is very likely due to observed increase in anthropogenic greenhouse gas concentrations.

Two months later on May 6, 2010, another open letter from 255 members of the U. S. National Academy of Sciences including 11 Nobel laureates stated that they were "deeply disturbed by the recent escalation of political assaults on scientists in general and on climate scientists in particular". They outlined scientific methodology and the conclusions of climate science, in contrast to "recent assaults on climate science and, more disturbingly, on climate scientists by climate change deniers." Regarding the mistakes found in the report, the letter expressed:

The Intergovernmental Panel on Climate Change (IPCC) and other scientific assessments of climate change, which involve thousands of scientists producing massive and comprehensive reports, have, quite expectedly and normally, made some mistakes. When errors are pointed out, they are corrected.
But there is nothing remotely identified in the recent events that changes the fundamental conclusions about climate change.

In July 2010, the Netherlands Environmental Assessment Agency put forward a publication stating that it had "found no errors that would undermine the main conclusions in the 2007 report of the Intergovernmental Panel on Climate Change (IPCC) on possible future regional impacts of climate change". Among the key findings the publication mentions:

Overall the summary conclusions are considered well founded, none have been found to contain any significant errors. The Working Group II contribution to the Fourth Assessment Report shows ample observational evidence of regional climate change impacts, which have been projected to pose substantial risks to most parts of the world, under increasing temperatures.
