= Aglaonice (disambiguation) =

Aglaonice was an ancient Thessalian witch

Aglaonice may also refer to:

- Aglaonice (moth), a genus of moth
- Aglaonice (crater), a crater on Venus
