= Climatic change =

Climatic change may refer to:

- Climatic Change (journal)
- Climate variability and change, climate change throughout Earth's history
- Climate change, climate change seen since the pre-industrial period
