= Indian Network on Climate Change Assessment =

Proposed network of scientists in India

The Indian Network on Climate Change Assessment (INCCA) is a proposed network of scientists in India to be set up to publish peer-reviewed findings on climate change in India.

It was announced on 7 October 2009 , saying:

The Fourth Assessment Report (AR4) of the Intergovernmental Panel on Climate change (IPCC), has reported that the impact of human activities on climate and climate systems is unequivocal. It is no longer a scientific enquiry but the concern now rather is the timing and magnitude of the abrupt changes in the climate anticipated in the future over and above the continuous climate change occurring due to the continuous warming of the atmosphere. The AR4 projects wide ranging implications and adverse impacts on developing countries for reasons of their lack of capacity to respond to rapid change. Alarmed by the findings, the government of the countries across the world are engaged in working out the impacts and associated vulnerabilities of their economies to impending projected climate change.

It was re-announced on 25 January 2012 by an official of the climate change division in the Environment Ministry after a strategy meeting chaired by Joint Secretary (Climate) J.M. Mausker, which also dealt with the framing of India's National Action Plan on Climate Change (NAPCC). On 4 February 2010 India's environment minister Jairam Ramesh announced that it would bring together 250 scientists from 125 Indian research institutions and collaborate with international organisations.its first assessment of greenhouse gas emission was released on May 11, 2010 and Its second climate assessment to be published in November 2010 would include reports on the Himalayas, the coastline of India, the Western Ghat highlands and the north-eastern region of India. He said it would operate as a “sort of Indian IPCC", but will not rival the UN’s Intergovernmental Panel on Climate Change (IPCC).

Ramesh also announced the initiation of an Indian National Institute of Himalayan Glaciology. He said that although he respected the IPCC, it was unequal to the task and its weakness was that it did not conduct its own research. Ramesh also indicated its biases made it insensitive to regional realities, and instead relied on compiling assessments of other reports, which, led to "goof-ups" on the Amazon forests, Himalayan glaciers, and ice caps.
