= NPCC =

NPCC may refer to:

- National Police Cadet Corps, a student uniformed organisation in Singapore
- National Police Chiefs' Council, a co-ordinating body for policing in the UK (replacing the previous Association of Chief Police Officers)
- Northeast Power Coordinating Council, one of nine regional electric reliability councils under North American Electric Reliability Corporation (NERC) authority
- North Point Community Church, a megachurch in Atlanta
- New York City Panel on Climate Change, an advisory panel to the New York City Mayor on climate change modeled on the Intergovernmental Panel on Climate Change (IPCC)
- National Power Control Centre, power control centre in Pakistan
- Nagaland Pradesh Congress Committee, branch of the Indian National Congress in Nagaland
