= Shindell =

Shindell is a surname. Notable people with the surname include:

- Drew Shindell, American climatologist
- Richard Shindell (born 1960), American singer-songwriter and musician
