= Michael R. Rampino =

American geologist

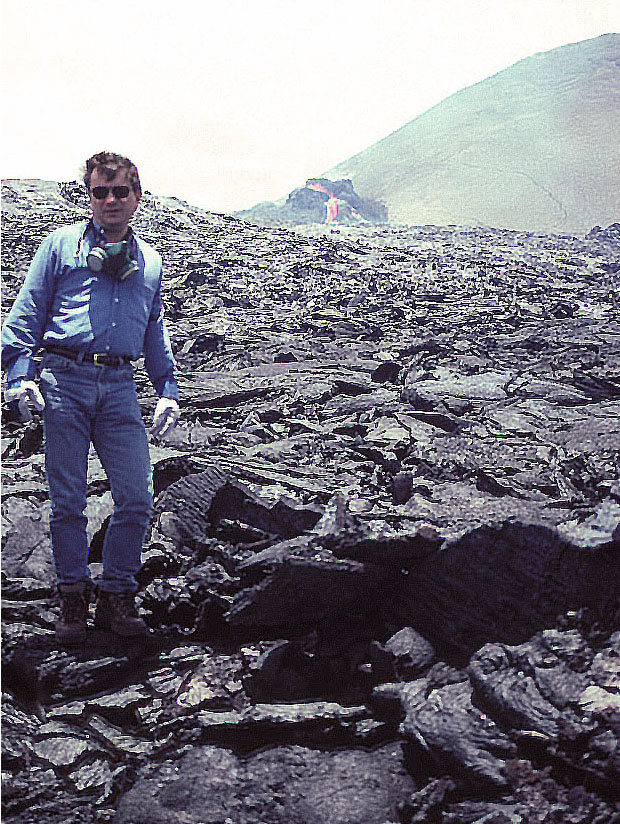
- Volcanic fieldwork in Hawaii
- Born: U.S.A.
- Education: Columbia University (PhD Geological Science) Hunter College CUNY, (BA Magna Cum Laude, Honors in Geology)
- Scientific career
- Fields: Biogeochemical cycles; Volcanology; Impact events; Mass extinctions; Geologic time scale; Planetary Science
- Workplaces: New York University
- Website: M.R.Rampino NYU website

Michael R. Rampino is a Geologist and Professor of Biology and Environmental Studies at New York University, known for his scientific contributions on causes of mass extinctions of life. Along with colleagues, he's developed theories about periodic mass extinctions being strongly related to the earth's position in relation to the galaxy. "The solar system and its planets experience cataclysms every time they pass "up" or "down" through the plane of the disk-shaped galaxy." These ~30 million year cyclical breaks are an important factor in evolutionary theory, along with other longer 60-million- and 140-million-year cycles potentially caused by mantle plumes within the planet, opining "The Earth seems to have a pulse," He is also a research consultant at NASA's Goddard Institute for Space Studies (GISS) in New York City.

Rampino's research has been concentrated in several areas including: studies of climate change on various timescales; the products and dynamics of volcanic eruptions and their effects on the global environment; and the relationship of large asteroid and comet impacts, and massive flood-basalt volcanism, with mass extinctions of life.

His most recent work has sought a connection between geologic events and astronomical processes, including encounters of Earth with dark matter in the Galaxy.

Rampino's interest in Astrobiology is evidenced by the text, “Origins of Life in the Universe”, co-authored with Robert Jastrow (Cambridge University Press, 2008), and a new book, “Cataclysms: A New Geology for the 21st Century” (Columbia University Press, 2017).

Rampino received his B.A. from Hunter College of CUNY and a Ph.D. in geological sciences from Columbia University. He was a post-doc at the NASA, Goddard Institute for Space Studies in New York City and Lamont–Doherty Earth Observatory in Palisades, New York studying climate change. He was an Associate Research Scientist at the NASA, Goddard Institute for 5 years, studying the effects of volcanic eruptions on climate, before taking up his present position at NYU.

== Fields of study ==
=== Climate change on various timescales ===
Rampino has been interested in climatic changes on time scales ranging from decades to hundreds of millions of years (Paleoclimatology). Early work centered on multi-year climate cooling after explosive volcanic eruptions, the post-glacial rise in sea level over the last 10,000 years, and glacial/interglacial climate and sea level over the last 150,000 years. In papers with Ken Caldeira at the Carnegie Institution, he explored the relationships of seafloor-spreading rates, atmospheric CO_{2} and climate in the very warm mid-Cretaceous Period 100 million years ago. They also considered the so-called “Goldilocks Problem” of Earth's habitability. More recent research is focused on the effects of flood-basalt volcanism and asteroid/comet impacts on climate and biological evolution. Rampino proposed the radical idea that some “glacial” deposits in the geologic record are actually impact-related debris flows.

=== Effects of volcanic eruptions on the global environment ===
Rampino has investigated the climatic and environmental effects of stratospheric aerosol clouds produced by explosive volcanic eruptions. With his colleagues Stephen Self, now at UC Berkeley and Richard Stothers of the Goddard Institute for Space Studies he studied the volcanic production of atmospheric sulfate aerosols using volcanological measurements of magmatic sulfur release, observations of volcanic aerosol clouds, and the record of atmospheric phenomena and climate changes after volcanic eruptions from historical accounts (including the ancient literature), and from the record of volcanism contained in polar ice cores

These studies included detailed field investigations of the historic 1883 eruption of Krakatoa, the 1963 eruption of Mount Agung and the 1815 eruption of Mount Tambora in Indonesia, and their climatic aftermath. The famous “Year Without a Summer” in 1816, during which Mary Shelley was forced to stay indoors to write Frankenstein; or, The Modern Prometheus, followed the great Tambora eruption. One focus of investigation is the huge “supereruption” (a word coined by Rampino and Self) of Mount Toba (now Lake Toba) in Sumatra ~74,000 years ago. This event may have created a severe “volcanic winter” (another term coined by Rampino) leading to a human population crash predicted from studies of the human genome. Such large eruptions threaten civilization.

=== Asteroid and comet impacts, massive volcanism and mass extinctions of life ===
Rampino became interested in the catastrophic effects of asteroids and comet impacts when it was discovered that the Chicxulub asteroid impact event (66 million years ago) had created the huge Chicxulub crater in Mexico, and led to the extinction of many forms of life, including the dinosaurs. Rampino has studied the globally distributed evidence for the Chicxulub impact with fieldwork in Europe, the western United States, Mexico and the Caribbean. After a periodic 26-million year cycle was proposed for mass extinctions of life in 1984, Rampino and Stothers reported a similar cycle in the ages of impact craters on the Earth. To explain the cycles, they proposed the “Shiva Hypothesis” in which the 30-million year oscillation of the Solar System through the dense Galactic plane leads to periodic comet showers on Earth.

More recent work has centered on the severe Permian–Triassic extinction event (252 million years ago), with fieldwork in South Africa, Hungary, Japan, India and China, particularly focused on the so-called “fungal event” marking the devastation of Late Permian vegetation. Rampino and colleagues found evidence that the mass extinction of 96% of marine species and much of life on land may have occurred in a brief period of only a few thousand years, suggesting some sort of cataclysm It turns out that this extinction occurred at the same time as the massive eruption of the Siberian Flood basalts. In 2017, Rampino and colleagues, studying the record of the great extinction, discovered a coincident worldwide layer rich in nickel that had been released by emanations from the huge eruptions. He and Caldeira concluded that most of the mass extinctions in the last 260 million years seem to have been associated with environmental catastrophes caused by either large impacts or flood-basalt eruptions.

=== Connections between geologic events and Earth’s interactions with Dark Matter ===
In 1993, Rampino and Caldeira reported a ubiquitous 26-million year cycle in geologic plate tectonic and volcanic activity. More recently, Rampino related this cycle to the Solar System's oscillation through the plane of the Milky Way Galaxy, which has a similar period. He attributes the Earth's internal-activity cycle to the planet's encounters with clumps of mysterious dark matter in the Galactic plane. Astrophysicists suggested that the dark matter particles can become trapped within the Earth where they self-destruct, releasing large amounts of heat and leading to periodic pulses in the planet's internal geologic activity. Thus, geologic activity on the Earth may be modulated by astrophysical circumstances.

== Books ==
Rampino has published two books, a text for a course on Astrobiology (Jastrow and Rampino, 2008) and a popular portrayal of the effects of catastrophic events on Earth history and the history of life (Rampino, 2017). He was co-editor of the conference volume “Climate: History, Periodicity and Predictability” published in 1987.

== Selected Articles ==
- Misztela, M.A., Rampino, M.R., Campbell, I.A., 2025, Platinum-group elements (PGEs) and rhenium in Permian-Triassic boundary sediments from southern China and Japan linked to concurrent eruptions of the Siberian Traps. Chemical Geology, v. 681, 122715.
- Rampino, M.R., Caldeira, K., Rodriguez, S., 2024, Sixteen mass extinctions of the past 541 My correlated with 15 pulses of Large Igneous Province (LIP) volcanism and the 4 largest extraterrestrial impacts. Global and Planetary Change, v. 234, 104369.
- Rampino, M.R., Caldeira, K., Rodriguez, S., 2023, Cycles of ~32.5 My and ~26.2 My in correlated episodes of continental flood basalts (CFBs), ‘hothouse’ climate pulses, anoxic oceans, and extinction events over the last 260 My. Earth-Science Reviews, v. 346, 104548.
- Rampino, M.R., et al., 2019b, “End-Permian stratigraphic timeline applied to the timing of marine and non-marine extinctions”: Palaeoworld, doi.org/10.1016/l.palwor.2019.10.002
- Rampino, M.R., 2020, “Relationship between impact-crater size and severity of related extinction episodes”: Earth-Science Reviews, v. 201, no. 102990.
- Rampino, M.R., et al., 2020b. “A 27.5-million year underlying cycle detected in extinctions of non-marine tetrapods”: Historical Biology doi.org/10.1080/0891.2020
- Rampino, M.R., and Caldeira, K., 2020, “A 32-million year cycle detected in sea-level fluctuations over the last 545 Myr”. Geoscience Frontiers, v. 11, p. 2061-2065.
- Zhang, H., Rampino, M.R., et al., 2021, “Felsic volcanism as a factor driving the end-Permian mass extinction”. Science Advances, v. 7, no. eabh 1390 (2021).
- Rampino, M.R., Caldeira, K., and Rodriguez, S., 2023, “Cycles of ~32.5 My and ~26.2 My in correlated episodes of continental flood basalts (CFBs), hyper-thermal climate pulses, anoxic oceans, and mass extinctions over the last 260 My: Connections between geological and astronomical cycles”: Earth-Science Reviews (in press).

== Edited Volumes ==
- Monechi, S., Coccioni, R., Rampino, M.R., editors, 2007, Large Ecosystem Perturbations. Geological Society of America, Special Paper 424.
- Coccioni, R., Monechi, S., Rampino, M.R., editors, 2007, K-T Boundary Events. Palaeogeography, Palaeoclimatology, Palaeoecology (Special Journal Issue).
