= International Satellite Cloud Climatology Project =

Climatological research project

The International Satellite Cloud Climatology Project (ISCCP) was established as the first project of the World Climate Research Program (WCRP). Since its inception in 1982, there have been two phases: 1983–1995 and 1995–2009. The project is responsible for collecting and analysing satellite radiance measurements of weather. It infers clouds' global distribution and properties, along with their diurnal, seasonal, and interannual variations. The results are studied to understand clouds in the climate, including their effects on radiative energy exchanges and their role in the global water cycle. These datasets provide a systematic view of cloud behavior.

The ISCCP headquarters were located at the Goddard Institute for Space Studies in New York City. ISCCP data is stored at the ISCCP Central Archive and at NASA. While the data are typically used for climate studies, they are also a valuable resource for astronomical pursuits. ISCCP was headed by William B. Rossow.

Since 1983, institutions around the world have collected and analyzed satellite radiance measurements from two polar orbiting and five geostationary satellites.

== Objectives ==
The goals and objectives of the ISCCP have included:

1. "Produce a global, reduced-resolution, calibrated and normalized, infrared and visible radiance dataset, along with basic information on the radiative properties of the atmosphere, from which cloud parameters can be derived.
2. Coordinate basic research on techniques for inferring the physical properties of clouds from satellite radiance data.
3. Derive and validate a global cloud climatology.
4. Promote research using ISCCP data to improve cloud parameterizations in climate models.
5. Improve understanding of the earth’s radiation budget (top-of-atmosphere and surface) and hydrological cycle."

== Criticism ==
Some scientists suggest that the decreasing trends in the ISCCP data are "satellite viewing geometry artifacts" and that the data may not be appropriate for some long-term global studies.

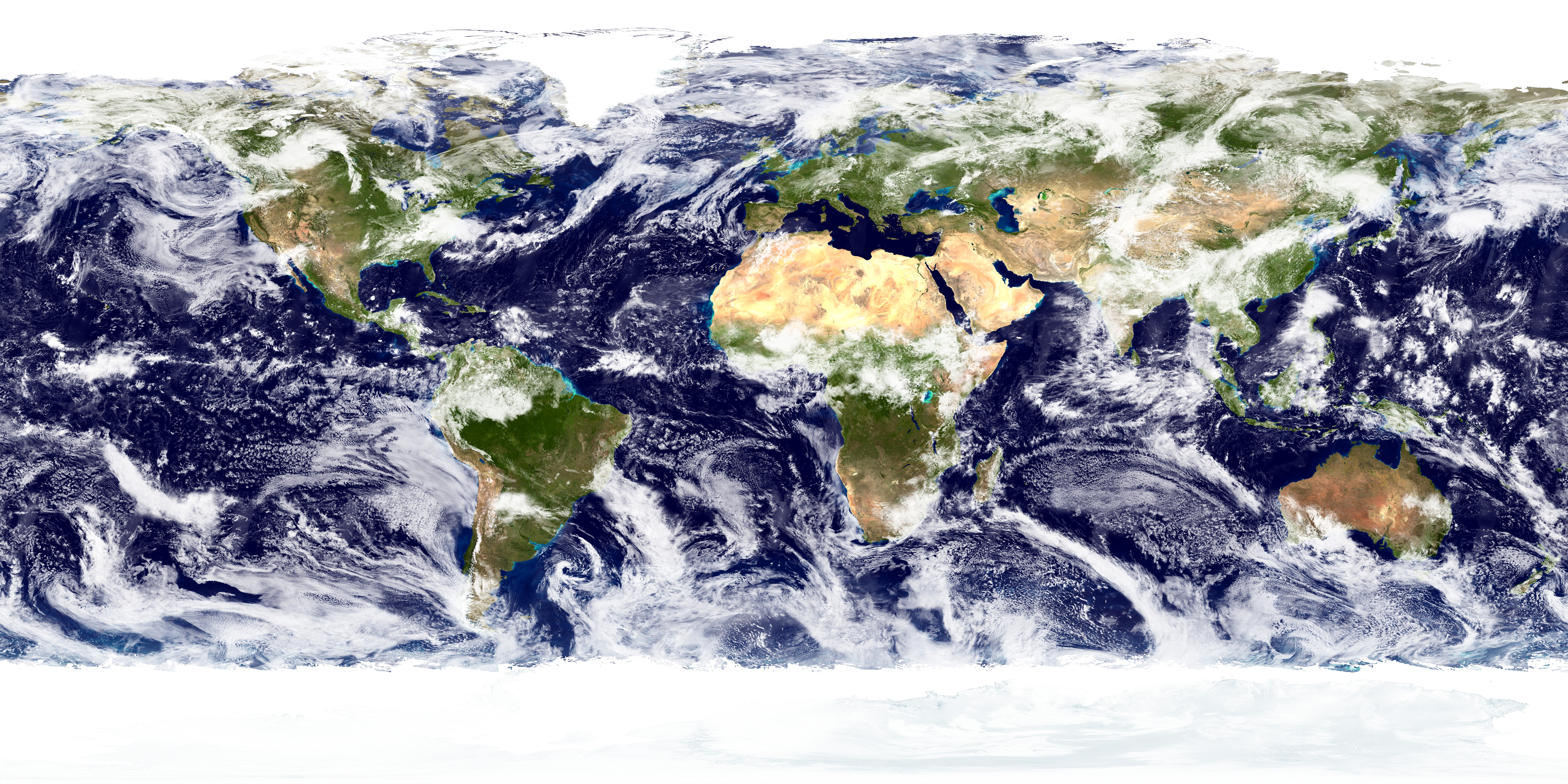
NASA Goddard Space Flight Center image of clouds, land, ocean, and sea ice

== See also ==
- Cooperative Institute for Meteorological Satellite Studies
