= Pier Vellinga =

Dutch environmental scientist

- Born: April 17, 1950 (age 76); Amsterdam
- Education: Delft University of Technology, Ph.D., 1984
- Occupation: Climate change expert
- Employer(s): Wageningen University, Vrije Universiteit Amsterdam
- Board member of: Royal Dutch Institute for Sea Research, Urgenda

Pier Vellinga (April 17, 1950) is an environmental scientist and one of the Netherlands' experts on the impacts of climate change.

== Career ==
He was among the first scientists to publish on climate change and its implications regarding water and energy in the eighties. His education and training includes a Fulbright scholarship in the US in 1967–68, an Msc (1976) and doctors degree at Delft University of Technology (1984).

His 1986 environmental science PhD on Beach Erosion and Dune Erosion During Storm provided the basis for the coastal safety evaluation (the Dutch Delta Plan).

In 1988, in a newly created position, he became advisor to the Minister of Housing, Spatial Planning and the Environment on the issue of Climate Change and the development of international CO_{2} policies. In this role he was key negotiator during the Netherlands EU-presidency of 1988. He was also one of the experts of the Advisory Group on Greenhouse Gases. For this advisory body he also chaired with Peter Gleick the "Targets and Indicators of Climatic Change" working group.

In 1991, Vellinga published an article with Robert Swart that became a cornerstone in the definition of the 2 °C target, than adopted by UNFCCC COP 15 in Copenhagen in 2009. This article also proposed for the first time a traffic-light visualization - based on red, yellow, green colours - that since then has been largely employed in risk management and climate change communication. In 1991/1992 he was one of the architects of the United Nations Framework Convention on Climate Change and in 1989 was actively involved in setting up the Intergovernmental Panel on Climate Change (IPCC) as vice chairman in its first bureau. He was as an author of various IPCC chapters (the work of the IPCC, including the contributions of many scientists, was recognised by the joint award of the 2007 Nobel Peace Prize).

From 1995 to 1998 he combined his work as director of the Institute for Environmental Studies (IVM) at the Vrije Universiteit Amsterdam (a position which he held from 1991 to 2001) with a part-time position at the World Bank, United Nations Environmental Program (UNEP) and United Nations Development Programme (UNDP) as Chairman of the Scientific and Technical Advisory Panel (STAP) of the Global Environmental Facility (GEF). From 1991 to 2006 he has been a professor of earth sciences at the Vrije Universiteit. Joyeeta Gupta, Richard Tol, Robert Swart and Hasse Goosen were among his first PhD students. He is Professor in Climate Change and Water Safety at Wageningen University.

In 2009 he initiated the international Delta Alliance, a collaboration among low-lying coastal areas in the world vulnerable to climate change. This initiative is still going on.

As of 2009, Vellinga is the chairman of the Knowledge for Climate research program and vice chairman of the Climate Changes Spatial Planning program. These programs support the Dutch government and companies with operational knowledge required for investment decisions related to climate change adaptation and mitigation. He has a chair in Climate and Water at Wageningen University (WUR), where he is director of the Wageningen University climate program, and has a part-time chair in Societal Impacts of Climate Change at the Institute of Environmental Studies of the Vrije Universiteit Amsterdam.

== Other activities ==
In 2003 he presented the Erasmus Liga Lecture on Climate Change and the safety of the Netherlands. This triggered national debate on the vulnerability of the Netherlands with regard to flooding and the need to update the Delta Plan. He was advisor to the second Delta Committee (2008) on sea level rise and coastal protection.

He is a member of the "Uffizio di Piano", a high level committee of scientists and policy makers charged by the Italian prime minister to supervise the high water protection and lagoon rehabilitation works in Venice. He is also a member of the supervisory board of the FMO-Bank (finance and development)

At a national level he is chairman of the board of the Royal Dutch Institute for Sea Research (NIOZ) and a member of the Energy Transition - Creative Energy platform. Lastly he is a member of the board of Urgenda.

As of 2020, Vellinga has published 28 scientific papers. In addition, he has more than 100 articles as author or co-author in books, scientific reports and proceedings of a more general nature. He has frequently appeared in news media and participated in several interviews and scientific documentaries made by national and international broadcasting cooperation's including BBC, ABC, CNN and Discovery. In August 2009, the Dutch weekly Elsevier choose him as the no. 1 climate alarmist of the Netherlands.

== Views on climate change ==
Vellinga's views on climate change are set out in his SID-lecture from 2008 and his 2008 inaugural lecture "Hoogtij in de Delta" at Wageningen UR.

== Selected publications and lectures ==
- Bouwer, Laurens M.; Vellinga, Pier (2006). "On the Flood Risk in The Netherlands". In Begum, S.; Stive, Marcel J.F.; Hall, James W. (eds.). Flood Risk Management in Europe: Innovation in Policy and Practice. Advances in Natural and Technological Hazards Research. Springer Verlag. ISBN 978-1-4020-4199-0.
- Kabat, P.; Vierssen, W. van; Veraart, J. A.; Vellinga, P.; Aerts, J. (2005). "Climate proofing the Netherlands" (PDF). Nature. 438 (7066): 283–284. Bibcode:2005Natur.438..283K. doi:10.1038/438283a. hdl:1871/31845. PMID 16292285. S2CID 5363010.
- Vellinga, P.; Swart, R. J. (1991). "The Greenhouse Marathon: Proposal for a Global Strategy". In Jager, J.; Ferguson, H. L. (eds.). Climate Change: Science Impact and Policy, proceedings of the Second World Climate Conference. New York: Cambridge University Press. ISBN 978-0-521-41631-3.
- Klimaatopwarming maakt voorbereiding in Nederland urgent [Global warming makes preparation in the Netherlands urgent] (Speech) (in Dutch). 2008. Archived from the original on 2012-09-05.
- SID-lecture (in Dutch)
- Erasmus Lecture on Climate Change and Safety at Vrije Universiteit
