= Danilova (crater) =

Crater on Venus

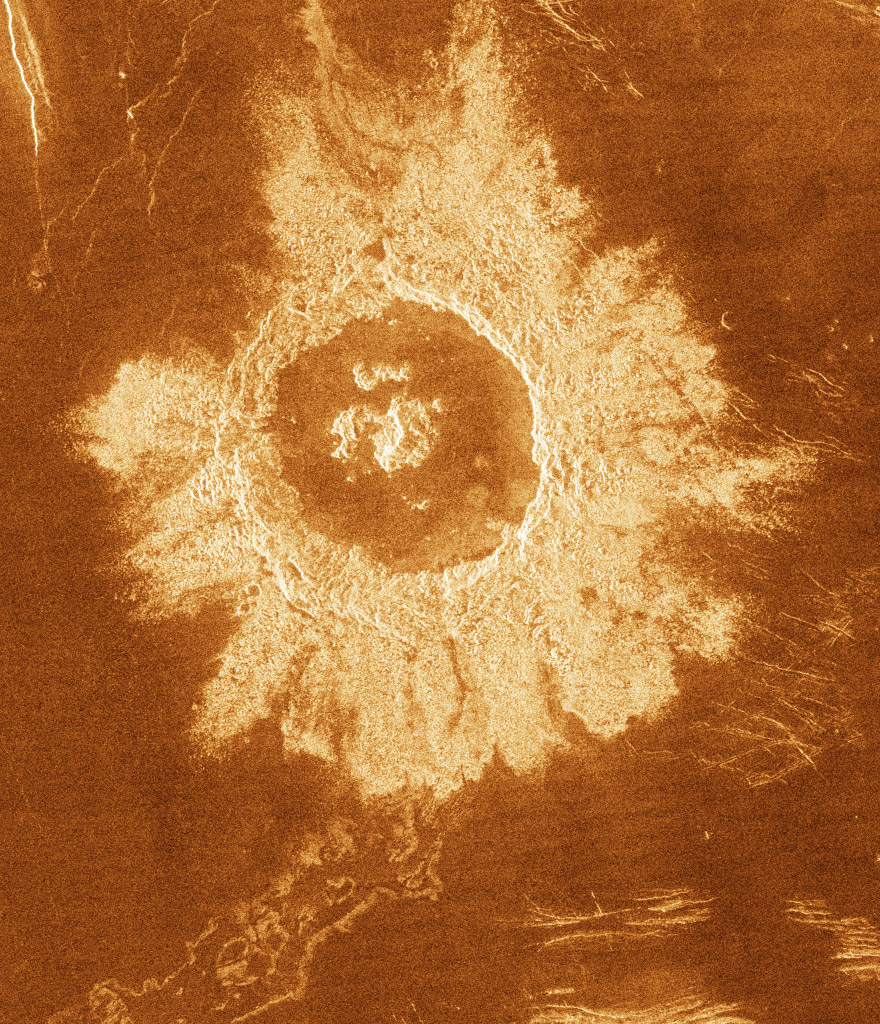
- Magellan radar image
- Location: Venus
- Coordinates: 26.4°S 337.2°E
- Diameter: 49 km (30 mi)
- Eponym: Maria Danilova

Danilova is an impact crater on Venus. It was named in 1991 after the Russian ballet dancer Maria Danilova.

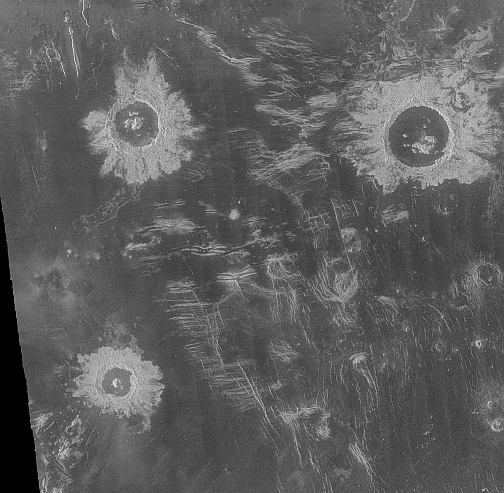
Danilova is part of a group of three craters. Clockwise from top left: Danilova, Aglaonice, and Saskia

Danilova has outflow deposits extending to the north and south.
