= Maria Danilova =

Russian ballet dancer (1793–1810)

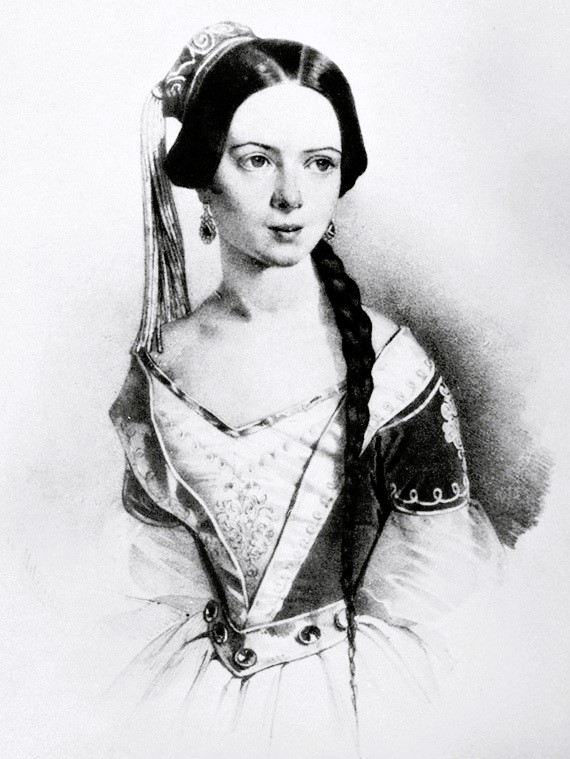
- Born: 1793; Saint Petersburg, Russia
- Died: 1810 (aged 17); Saint Petersburg, Russia
- Occupation: Dancer

Maria Danilova (1793 – 1810) was a Russian ballet dancer.

== Biography ==
Danilova enrolled in the St. Petersburg school at the age of eight. The trainer Charles-Louis Didelot took notice of her talent, and she made her first public appearance a year later. By the age of 15 she was dancing with Louis-Antoine Duport. Her dancing was described as "so light and elusive that it took the audience's breath away". Danilova had a fragile constitution and the stress of performance as well as a brief, unhappy affair with Duport took a toll on her health. She died of tuberculosis at the age of 17.

The Danilova crater on Venus is named in her honor.

== Sources ==
- "Данилова, Марья" . Brockhaus and Efron Encyclopedic Dictionary (in Russian). 1906.
