= Aglaonice (crater) =

Crater on Venus

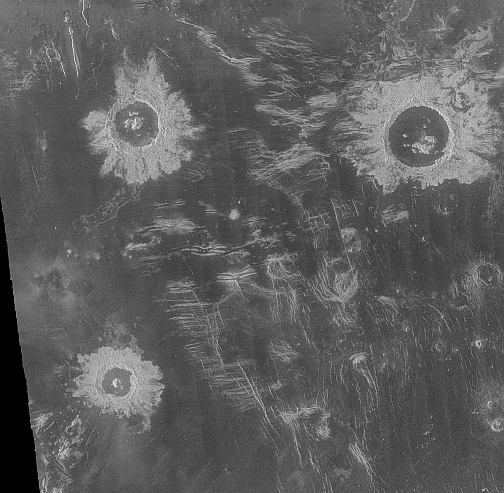
- Image of the group of three craters, Aglaonice is in the top right corner, Danilova is top left, and Saskia is bottom left.
- Location: Venus
- Diameter: 63.7 km
- Eponym: Ancient Greek astronomer

Aglaonice is a crater on the surface of Venus in Lavinia Planitia, with a diameter of 63.7 km.

The crater's name derives and is named after the ancient Greek astronomer named Aglaonice. It was soon accepted and adopted by the International Astronomical Union in 1991.

== Surrounding Geology ==
Aglaonice is located in the plain called Lavinia Planitia, with its surrounding terrain's elevation of 6051.61 km. It is part of the group consisting of three craters. The group includes:

- Danilova, a crater 49 km in diameter, and
- Saskia, another crater 37.1 km in diameter.

Another nearby feature is the Aglaonice dune field, which is approximately located 100 km north of the Aglaonice crater.

== Geological description ==
Aglaonice was formed by an impact of an asteroid. The crater has a diameter of 63.8 km. It has an ejecta flow channel of 180 km. Its walls have a width of 3.5 km. It has a continuous ejecta with a radius of 43 km.
