= Nadine Unger =

Atmospheric chemistry researcher

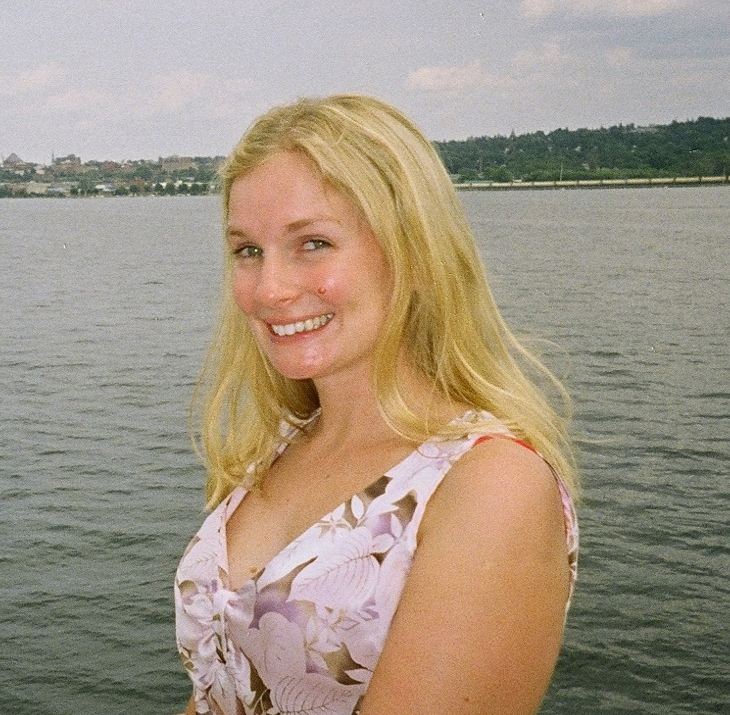
- Unger in 2009
- Education: University of Leeds
- Scientific career
- Workplaces: University of Exeter; Yale University; Goddard Institute for Space Studies
- Thesis: Modelling radical chemistry of the troposphere (2000)

Nadine Unger (née Bell) is a Professor of Atmospheric Chemistry at the University of Exeter. She has studied the role of human activities and forests on the Earth's climate.

== Early life and education ==
Unger earned her doctoral degree in atmospheric chemistry at the University of Leeds, where she worked on isoprene chemistry. The small molecule isoprene is a volatile organic compound that can react with nitrogen oxide to form the greenhouse gas ozone. Isoprene can also extend the lifetime of atmospheric methane. Whilst these two processes cause global warming, isoprene can also produce aerosol particles that block sunlight, resulting in a cooling effect. After earning her PhD, Unger was a postdoctoral scholar at Harvard University. Unger joined the Goddard Institute for Space Studies where she worked on air pollution and the impact of climate change on air quality. Her research involved modelling the emissions from future industries. Industries commonly burn fossil fuels that release carbon dioxide, which can result in global warming, but they also release sulphates that enter the atmosphere as aerosols. These aerosols can cause the atmosphere to cool by blocking out heat from the sun and modifying the clouds so that they reflect more heat back to space. She identified that until 2050 road vehicle emissions will dominate human emissions, but after then power sector emissions will take the lead.

== Research and career ==
Unger joined Yale University as an assistant professor at the School of Forestry & Environmental Studies, where she was part of the Yale Himalaya Initiative. Here she studied the role of aviation in climate change on global temperature. She created a global-scale model that could evaluate the impact of reducing the levels sulphur in jet fuel on air quality. Unger has studied the role of ozone and aerosols on the Earth's radiation balance, and the feedback between air quality and climate change. Unger used the Yale University supercomputer to study the impact of the volatile organic compounds released during wildfires. She calculated the concentration of aerosol particles and methane release during the Pliocene, and compared it to those released during the pre-industrial era. She has argued that to achieve the Paris Agreement temperature targets wealthy countries will have to reduce carbon dioxide emissions from energy-use.

She moved to the University of Exeter, where she works as a Professor of Atmospheric Chemistry and Climate Modelling. Her research group look to establish the impact of short-term climate forcers on air quality and climate. She has studied the impact of volatile organic compounds released by plants on the Earth's atmosphere, finding that they create a chemical mist that enhances diffuse light, which benefits photosynthesis, whilst simultaneously serving to block direct light. This mist serves to increase the amount of solar radiation that reaches the deep layers of the forest, making the atmosphere better for the plants themselves. She has identified that Central West Africa is particularly vulnerable to fire air pollution damage.

== Selected publications ==
- Unger, Nadine (2009-10-30). "Improved Attribution of Climate Forcing to Emissions". Science. 326 (5953): 716–718. Bibcode:2009Sci...326..716S. doi:10.1126/science.1174760. PMID 19900930. S2CID 30881469.
- Unger, Nadine (2010-02-23). "Attribution of climate forcing to economic sectors". Proceedings of the National Academy of Sciences. 107 (8): 3382–3387. Bibcode:2010PNAS..107.3382U. doi:10.1073/pnas.0906548107. PMC 2816198. PMID 20133724.
- Unger, Nadine (2018). "Fire air pollution reduces global terrestrial productivity". Nature Communications. 9 (1): 5413. Bibcode:2018NatCo...9.5413Y. doi:10.1038/s41467-018-07921-4. PMC 6303378. PMID 30575760.
