= George P. L. Walker =

British volcanologist (1926–2005)

George P. L. Walker FRS
- Born: George Patrick Leonard Walker; 2 March 1926
- Died: 17 January 2005 (aged 78)
- Education: Queen's University, Belfast (BSc, 1948), (MSc, 1949); University of Leeds (PhD, 1956)
- Known for: Volcanology; mineralogy.
- Scientific career
- Fields: Volcanologist
- Workplaces: Imperial College London; University of Auckland; University of Hawaiʻi
- Doctoral advisor: William Quarrier Kennedy
- Doctoral students: Steve Sparks; Stephen Self; Geoff Wadge; Ian S. E. Carmichael; Colin Wilson

George Patrick Leonard Walker FRS (2 March 1926 – 17 January 2005) was a British geologist who began his career studying mineralogy and later made significant contributions to volcanology. He was widely regarded as one of the pioneers of modern quantitative volcanology.

== Biography ==
Walker was born in Harlesden, on 2 March 1926. He was the only child of Leonard Walker, an insurance salesman, and Evelyn Frances (nee McConkey), a nurse. He went to school at Acton Lane Elementary School, and won a scholarship to Willesden County School in 1937. In 1939, Walker and his mother were in Ballinderry, County Antrim, when World War II broke out. They stayed in Ballinderry, and Walker completed his schooling at Wallace High School, Lisburn. Walker went to Queen's University, Belfast to study geology and graduated with a BSc in 1948, and an MSc in 1949. He then went on to study for a PhD at the University of Leeds, under the supervision of W Q Kennedy. His dissertation focused on the secondary (alteration) minerals in the igneous rocks of Northern Ireland. Walker joined Kennedy on the 1952 British Museum Ruwenzori expedition and in a 1953 expedition to the Belgian Congo.

== Career and research ==
In 1952, Walker took up an assistant lectureship in mineralogy at Imperial College, London. He was promoted to lecturer in 1954 and finished his PhD in 1956. For the next ten years, Walker turned his attention to the study of alteration minerals in lavas of eastern Iceland, spending each summer from 1955 to 1966 mapping in Iceland. This work earned him an international reputation as a meticulous mineralogist, and provided the first evidence for how the crust grows at oceanic ridges. In 1964, Walker was promoted to Reader at Imperial college. Following the eruption of Surtsey from 1963-1967, Walker began to take an interest in active volcanism. This led to some of his pioneering studies, first of basaltic volcanism and lava flows on Mount Etna; and later, on pyroclastic rocks and the products of explosive volcanic eruptions, in Italy, the Azores and Tenerife.

In 1977, Walker was awarded a Captain James Cook Fellowship of the Royal Society of New Zealand, which he took up at the University of Auckland. Although this began as a visiting position, in 1978 Walker resigned from Imperial College, and moved to New Zealand with his family. In 1981, he moved to the newly created Gordon Macdonald Chair in Volcanology at the University of Hawaiʻi. He remained in post until retirement, in 1996.

=== Awards and honours ===
Walker received many awards and fellowships in recognition of his work.

- Icelandic Order of the Falcon, conferred by the president of Iceland in 1977.
- Election as Fellow of the Royal Society in 1975.
- McKay Hammer award of the Geoscience Society of New Zealand in 1982.
- Lyell Medal of the Geological Society of London in 1982.
- University of Hawaiʻi Board of Regents Award for Excellence in Research in 1985.
- Honorary Fellowship of the Royal Society of New Zealand in 1987.
- Fellowship of the Geological Society of America in 1987.
- Fellowship of the American Geophysical Union in 1988.
- Honorary D.Sc. from the University of New Zealand in 1988.
- Dr. scient. hon. c. from the University of Iceland in 1988.
- Thorarinsson Medal (IAVCEI) in 1989.
- Wollaston Medal (Geological Society of London) in 1995.

=== Selected publications ===
- Walker, George P. L. (September 1960). "Zeolite Zones and Dike Distribution in Relation to the Structure of the Basalts of Eastern Iceland". The Journal of Geology. 68 (5): 515–528. Bibcode:1960JG.....68..515W. doi:10.1086/626685. JSTOR 30059352. S2CID 140566286.
- Walker, George P. L. (July 1973). "Explosive volcanic eruptions — a new classification scheme". Geologische Rundschau. 62 (2): 431–446. Bibcode:1973GeoRu..62..431W. doi:10.1007/BF01840108. S2CID 129590129.
- Walker, George P.L. (September 1983). "Ignimbrite types and ignimbrite problems". Journal of Volcanology and Geothermal Research. 17 (1–4): 65–88. Bibcode:1983JVGR...17...65W. doi:10.1016/0377-0273(83)90062-8.
- Wilson, Lionel; R. Stephen J. Sparks; George P. L. Walker (1987). "Explosive volcanic eruptions — IV. The control of magma properties and conduit geometry on eruption column behaviour". Geophysical Journal of the Royal Astronomical Society. 63 (1): 117–148. Bibcode:1980GeoJ...63..117W. doi:10.1111/j.1365-246X.1980.tb02613.x.
