= S. Ichtiaque Rasool =

Indian-American climatologist (1933–2016)

Ichtiaque Rasool
- Born: January 16, 1933; Lucknow, India
- Died: April 26, 2016 (aged 83); Bethesda, Maryland, United States
- Education: University of Paris
- Children: 2
- Scientific career
- Fields: Planetary atmospheres, global change
- Institutions: Goddard Institute for Space Studies; NASA Headquarters

S. Ichtiaque Rasool (1933–2016) was a Pakistani-American chief scientist for global change at the National Aeronautics and Space Administration (NASA). His main research interests were in the fields of physics of atmospheres and remote sensing of planets and Earth. He was a senior research scientist at NASA's Jet Propulsion Laboratory and visiting professor at the Complex Systems Research Center of the University of New Hampshire. From 1990 to 1997 he directed the International Geosphere-Biosphere Programme-Data and Information System (IGBP-DIS) program.

In 2015, a year before his death, he released his memoirs, My Life: From Riches to Rags and (almost) Back: A Memoir.

== Education and early work ==
Rasool was born in Lucknow, British India. After receiving his early education at the Lucknow University, his family moved to Pakistan, where he continued his education at the Geophysical Institute. He earned his doctorate in atmospheric sciences in 1956 from the University of Paris.

He moved to the U.S. in 1961 at the invitation of Robert Jastrow of the Goddard Institute for Space Studies (GISS) and began a long career with the National Aeronautics and Space Administration (NASA).

== Career ==
After joining GISS he collaborated on several planetary atmosphere studies, including Mariner radio occultation measurements of the atmospheres/ionospheres of Mars and Venus. He became editor of the Journal of the Atmospheric Sciences and actively solicited papers on planetary atmospheres.

In 1968 he spent a sabbatical year in Paris, during which he gave lectures and helped form a planetology group at the Paris Observatory. He wrote one of the early papers on the runaway greenhouse effect on Venus. With Stephen Schneider he was involved in an early controversy over the effects of CO_{2} and atmospheric aerosols on global warming.

He became a U.S. citizen in 1970, and in 1971 he moved to NASA Headquarters as the deputy director for Planetary Programs. At this time NASA's "Grand Tour" mission was under consideration. This was cancelled but then resurrected as Voyager 1 and Voyager 2. During this period the launches and landings of the Viking 1 and Viking 2 spacecraft to Mars took place. Later, Rasool served as Noel Hinners' deputy in the Office of Space Science before moving to work on NASA's earth science programs.

Throughout his career Rasool was a strong advocate for international cooperation in Earth and planetary sciences. As Chief Scientist in the NASA Office of Space and Terrestrial Applications, he was responsible for assuring the scientific integrity of NASA's programs in earth observations, including giving testimony to Congress. He also served as chief scientist for global change programs in the Office of Space Science and Applications.

Rasool was a co-founder of the International Satellite Land Surface Climatology Project (chairman from 1981 to 1992), and was one of the founders of the International Geosphere-Biosphere Programme (IGBP). He was instrumental in establishing the NASA Pathfinder program for global data sets and became director of the IGBP Data and Information System in 1990. He was editor of the Journal of the Atmospheric Sciences and co-editor of Space Science Reviews.

== Honors ==
Rasool was the recipient of the NASA Exceptional Scientific Achievement Medal in 1974, the COSPAR William Nordberg Medal in 1988, and the William T. Pecora Award in 2002.

== Selected publications ==
- Rasool, S. I. (1961): Structure of planetary atmospheres.
- Rasool, S. I. and C. De Bergh (1970): The runaway greenhouse and the accumulation of CO_{2} in the Venus atmosphere.
- Rasool, S. I. and S. H. Schneider (1971): Atmospheric carbon dioxide and aerosols: Effects of large increases on global climate.
- Rasool, S. I. (1999): Scientific responsibility in global climate change research.
