= Wilfried Haeberli =

Swiss glaciologist and geomorphologist

- Born: January 19, 1947 (age 79); Basel, Switzerland
- Citizenship: Swiss
- Education: University of Basel (PhD, 1974); ETH Zurich (Habilitation, 1985)
- Known for: Mountain permafrost research; direction of the World Glacier Monitoring Service
- Scientific career
- Fields: Glaciology, geomorphology, permafrost research
- Workplaces: University of Zurich; ETH Zurich; World Glacier Monitoring Service

Wilfried Haeberli (born 19 January 1947) is a Swiss glaciologist and geomorphologist. He is professor emeritus of Physical Geography at the University of Zurich. He is also former director of the World Glacier Monitoring Service. His research focus on glaciers, mountain permafrost, cryosphere monitoring, and the impacts of climate change on high-mountain environments.

== Early life and education ==
Haeberli was born in Basel, Switzerland. He studied geography at the University of Basel. He completed his doctorate in 1974 with research on alpine permafrost. In 1985, he received his habilitation in glaciology and geomorphology from ETH Zurich.

== Career ==
Haeberli joined the Laboratory of Hydraulics, Hydrology and Glaciology at ETH Zurich. Between 1989 and 1995, he headed the Glaciology Division at VAW.

In 1983, Haeberli assumed responsibility for coordinating international glacier observations. In 1986 he became the first director of the World Glacier Monitoring Service. He held this position until 2010.

In 1995, Haeberli was appointed Full Professor of Physical Geography at the University of Zurich. He led the Glaciology, Geomorphodynamics and Geochronology Unit until his retirement in 2012. Following his retirement, he was named professor emeritus.

== Research ==
Haeberli is regarded as one of the pioneers of modern mountain permafrost research. His studies introduced process-based models linking frost weathering, rock glaciers, talus slopes, and permafrost creep, providing a framework for understanding landscape evolution in cold mountain regions.

He contributed to the development of long-term monitoring techniques, including borehole temperature measurements and geophysical investigations that documented the effects of atmospheric warming on alpine permafrost.

Haeberli pioneered methods for reconstructing glacier-bed overdeepenings and predicting the formation of new glacial lakes following glacier retreat, providing tools for hazard assessment and climate adaptation in mountain regions. His research has been applied in the Alps as well as in the Andes, Himalayas, and other high-mountain environments.

== Selected publications ==
- Haeberli, W. (1985). Creep of mountain permafrost: internal structure and flow of Alpine rock glaciers. Mitteilung VAW/ETHZ, 74.
- Haeberli, W., & Hoelzle, M. (1995). "Application of inventory data for estimating characteristics of and regional climate-change effects on mountain glaciers". Zeitschrift für Gletscherkunde und Glazialgeologie.
- Haeberli, W., Barry, R. & Cihlar, J. (2000). "Glacier monitoring within the Global Climate Observing System". Annals of Glaciology, 31, 241–246.
- Haeberli, W., Kääb, A., Vonder Mühll, D. & Teysseire, Ph. (2001). "Prevention of outburst floods from periglacial lakes at Grubengletscher, Valais, Swiss Alps". Journal of Glaciology, 47(156), 111–122.
- Haeberli, W., Huggel, C., Kääb, A., Zgraggen-Oswald, S., Polkvoj, A., Galushkin, I., Zotikov, I. & Osokin, N. (2004). "The Kolka-Karmadon rock/ice slide of 20 September 2002: an extraordinary event of historical dimensions in North Ossetia, Russian Caucasus". Journal of Glaciology, 50(171), 533–546.
