= Richard Tol =

Dutch economist

- Born: 2 December 1969 (age 56); Zwaag (Hoorn), Netherlands

Academic background
- Education: Vrije Universiteit Amsterdam
- Influences: Pier Vellinga, Harmen Verbruggen, Aart de Vos

Academic work
- Discipline: Environmental economics
- Institutions: University of Sussex
- Notable ideas: Economics of global warming

Richard S. J. Tol (born 2 December 1969, Hoorn, the Netherlands) is a professor of economics at the University of Sussex. He is also professor of the economics of climate change at the Vrije Universiteit Amsterdam. He is a member of the Academia Europaea and a Fellow of the Royal Economic Society.

== Academic career ==
Tol obtained an MSc in econometrics & operations research in 1992 and a PhD in economics in 1997 at the VU University Amsterdam. His doctoral thesis was titled, A decision-analytic treatise of the enhanced greenhouse effect. In 1998, he contributed with some nineteen other academics to a joint project of the United Nations Environment Programme at his home university.

Tol regularly participates in studies of the Energy Modeling Forum, was an editor of Energy Economics, associate editor of Environmental and Resource Economics, and a member of the editorial board of Environmental Science and Policy, and Integrated Assessment. IDEAS/RePEc ranks him among the top 250 economists in the world.

Tol specialises in energy economics and environmental economics, with a particular interest in climate change, such as the economics of global warming. Previously, Tol was a research professor at the Economic and Social Research Institute. Before that, Tol was the Michael Otto Professor of Sustainability and Global Change and director of the Center for Marine and Atmospheric Sciences and board member of the Center for Marine and Climate Research at the University of Hamburg. Tol was a board member of the International Max Planck Research Schools on Earth System Modeling and Maritime Affairs and the European Forum on Integrated Environmental Assessment. From 1998 to 2008 he was an adjunct professor at Carnegie Mellon University's Department of Engineering and Public Policy, and from 2010 to 2011 an adjunct professor at Trinity College, Dublin's Department of Economics.

== Climate change ==
Tol considers the economic impact of climate change to be "relatively small". Despite being an economist he was also among the US Senate Republican Party's "list of scientists disputing man-made global warming claims", which stated that Tol "dismissed the idea that mankind must act now to prevent catastrophic global warming".

Tol characterises his position as arguing that the economic costs of climate policy should be kept in proportion to its benefits.

In an interview with Der Spiegel in 2005, he argued that temperature rises between 2–4 °C would also have advantages. North of a line drawn from Paris to Munich, people would benefit, e.g., from reduced energy bills. However, south of it, people would be overall "losers" of climate change.

In 2006 he argued against the 2 °C 'guardrail' target for limiting temperature rises. Tol does not advocate another target, but has suggested that a carbon tax of $20/tC would be a policy in line with estimates of the cost of carbon. He acknowledges that this level of taxation is too low to significantly discourage fossil fuel use but argues it would help to stimulate the development of fuel-saving technology and improve the competitiveness of renewable energy sources. He states that compliance may affect the coal and oil industries and the people they employ.

In 2007, Tol predicted a reduction in annual economic growth of 0.3-0.4% in the Republic of Ireland if greenhouse gases were reduced by 3% per year.

In 2009, Tol published a controversial paper that combined data from several earlier studies, concluding that at least some amount of global warming could lead to economic gains. In 2014, he published an update, correcting missing minus signs that had turned economic costs into benefits and adding data overlooked before; the mistakes he attributed to "gremlins". According to Tol, the old and new results were not significantly different. The degree to which the corrected, more pessimistic results alter the original conclusions and their policy implications was hotly debated. In 2015 it was reported that a second round of corrections to the paper was necessary.

Tol was a coordinating lead author of the IPCC Fifth Assessment Report Working Group II, contributing to the economics chapter. Tol said in March 2014 that he had withdrawn from the writing team for the Summary for Policy Makers of the report in September 2013, citing disagreement with the profile of the report which he considered too alarmist and putting too little emphasis on opportunities to adapt to climate changes.

=== Copenhagen Consensus ===
Bjørn Lomborg chose Tol to participate in his "Copenhagen Consensus" project in 2008. In 2008, Tol collaborated with Gary Yohe, Richard G. Richels, and Geoffrey Blanford to prepare the "Challenge Paper" on global warming which examined three approaches devised by Lomborg for tackling the issue. The 3 results were then compared with 27 similar investigations, 3 each relating to 9 other 'challenges' in the areas of health and environment. Of the 30 policy alternatives that resulted, Lomborg's ranking procedure rated the 2 dealing with controlling emissions of greenhouse gases 29th and 30th in terms of cost effectiveness.

A "perspective paper" by Anil Markandya of the University of Bath on the Yohe/Tol study stated that "a short time period analysis is misleading" when all the costs are incurred during the period examined but benefits continue to accrue after its conclusion. He pointed out that the study "stops short of the most that can be supported on a cost benefit basis" and stated that "it does not seem reasonable" to rely solely on Tol's own FUND model when alternatives "reported in the peer-reviewed literature are also credible".

Gary Yohe later accused Lomborg of "deliberate distortion of our conclusions", adding that "as one of the authors of the Copenhagen Consensus Project's principal climate paper, I can say with certainty that Lomborg is misrepresenting our findings thanks to a highly selective memory". In a subsequent joint statement settling their differences, Lomborg and Yohe agreed that the "failure" of Lomborg's emissions reduction plan "could be traced to faulty design".

Lomborg awarded Tol a position on his Copenhagen Consensus panel again in 2009. Tol said that Lomborg "plays a useful role in the debate on climate policy".
