= Christine P. Hendon =

American electrical engineer and computer scientist

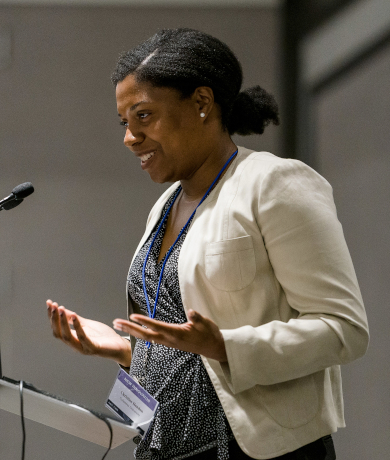
- Hendon in 2019
- Education: Massachusetts Institute of Technology; Case Western Reserve University; Harvard Medical School
- Known for: Optical coherence imaging for interventional heart arrhythmia procedures
- Awards: 2017 Presidential Early Career Awards for Scientists and Engineers (PECASE), 2013 MIT Technology Review's 35 Innovators Under 35, 2012 Forbes 30 under 30 in Science and Healthcare
- Scientific career
- Fields: Electrical and biomedical engineering
- Workplaces: Columbia University

Christine P. Hendon is an electrical engineer and computer scientist and an associate professor in the Department of Electrical Engineering at Columbia University in New York City. Hendon is a pioneer in medical imaging. She develops biomedical optics technologies, using optical coherence tomography and near infrared spectroscopy systems, that enable physicians to perform guided interventional procedures and allow for structure-function dissection of human tissues and organs. Her advances in imaging technologies have led to improved diagnostic abilities and treatments for cardiac arrhythmias as well as breast cancer and preterm birth. She has been recognized for her development of optical imaging catheters for cardiac wall imaging by Forbes 30 under 30, the MIT Technology Review's 35 Innovators Under 35, and by President Obama with the Presidential Early Career Awards in 2017.

== Early life and education ==
Hendon (born Christine Fleming), wanted to pursue a career as a teacher during her childhood. In high school, she enjoyed math and science, and participated in the Institute for Climate and Planets program hosted by the NASA Goddard Institute for Space Studies. This program inspired her to pursue a career in science.

In 2000, Hendon pursued her undergraduate education at the Massachusetts Institute of Technology, in Cambridge, Massachusetts. She majored in Electrical Engineering and Computer Science and became immediately involved in undergraduate research. Hendon graduated with her Bachelors of Science in 2004.

Hendon then pursued her Master's of Science and her PhD training at Case Western Reserve University in Biomedical Engineering. She completed her M.S. in 2007, and her Ph.D. in 2010. During her PhD, Hendon worked under the mentorship of Andrew M. Rollins where she began using and optimizing Optical Coherence Tomography (OCT) techniques to create volumetric images of human tissues and organs for use in treatment of cardiac arrhythmias. She developed an automated algorithm for fiber orientation in the plane parallel to the wall surface of cardiac tissue in order to properly characterize early structural changes in the myocardium due to disease and injury to guide treatment. Her work showed that OCT can help to visualize real time ablation (RFA) therapy to guide physicians treatment progression and thus improve the outcomes of RFA therapy.

Following her Ph.D., Hendon moved back to Massachusetts and pursued her Postdoctoral research fellowship at Harvard Medical School and Massachusetts General Hospital in the Biomedical Optics Wellman Center for Photomedicine. During this time, Hendon optimized the depth resolved spectral analysis of OCT. She completed her postdoctoral fellowship in 2012.

== Career and research ==
In 2012, Hendon was recruited to Columbia University as an assistant professor in the School of Engineering and Applied Sciences in the Department of Electrical Engineering. In 2018, Hendon was promoted to Associate Professor with tenure. Hendon is the Principal Investigator of the Structure-Function Imaging Laboratory. Her lab focuses on developing novel biomedical technologies for guided imaging of biological tissues and improved diagnosis and treatment of cancer and cardiac arrhythmias. Her work integrates real-time processing algorithms to extract physiological information from Optical Coherence Tomography (OCT) imaging data. Hendon is also a member of the National Society of Black Engineers (NSBE), The International Society for Optics and Photonics (SPIE and The Optical Society (OSA).

=== OCT guided atrial fibrillation treatment ===
Hendon helped to improve and guide ablation treatment of atrial fibrillation using a near-infrared spectroscopy (NIRS) guided catheter implantation. Her results showed improved results of radio-frequency ablation therapy. Hendon then used her knowledge and expertise in OCT to characterize the structure-function relationship of heart tissue. She showed that she was able to image, with high resolution, elastic fibers, Purkinje fibers, and collagen fiber bundles, as well as observe tissue pathology. Since the composition of atrial tissue impacts disease pathology, diagnosis, and recovery, Hendon and her team developed an automated method to classify tissue composition of the atria using a relevance vector machine model. The classification accuracy was over 80% showing its utility in classifying tissue composition and guiding diagnosis and treatment. With Hendon's technology, physicians that previously treated cardiac arrhythmias essentially blind to the tissue changes, can now observe tissue changes and improvements in realtime to enhance treatment accuracy and recovery.

=== OCT for breast cancer ===
Hendon began adapting her OCT algorithms for use in the diagnosis and treatment of breast cancer. The imaging technique has been nicknamed "optical ultrasound" and, using ultra-high resolution OCT, she was able to improve the characterization and diagnosis of breast cancer.

=== OCT imaging and preterm birth ===
Hendon then became interested in exploring the structure-function relationship of the cervix and how characterizing this relationship could provide insight into causes of preterm birth and possible prevention strategies. Hendon first found that collagen fiber dispersion and directionality had an impact on cervical remodelling and thus propensity for preterm birth. Since this remodelling results in shortening of the cervix, which is thought to result in preterm birth, Hendon sought to further understand the structural properties that underlie shortening and elucidate approaches to prevent preterm birth. By assessing the collagen fiber orientation through her material modelling framework, Hendon was able to determine the basis for cervical deformation using OCT and biomechanically explore the causes of preterm birth at the level of tissue microstructure.

== Awards and honors ==
- 2021 Elected as Fellow of the International Society for Optics and Photonics (SPIE)
- 2017 Presidential Early Career Awards for Scientists and Engineers (PECASE)
- 2015 National Science Foundation Career Award
- 2015 Rodriguez Family Junior Faculty Development Award at the School of Engineering and Applied Science
- 2014 NIH New Innovator Award
- 2013 MIT Technology Review's 35 Innovators Under 35
- 2012 Forbes 30 under 30 in Science and Healthcare
- 2012 Wellman-Bullock Postdoctoral Fellowship - Massachusetts General Hospital

== Select publications ==
- Ha R, Friedlander LC, Hibshoosh H, et al. Optical Coherence Tomography: A Novel Imaging Method for Post-lumpectomy Breast Margin Assessment-A Multi-reader Study. Acad Radiol. 2018;25(3):279-287. doi:10.1016/j.acra.2017.09.018
- Ling Y, Yao X, Hendon CP. Highly phase-stable 200 kHz swept-source optical coherence tomography based on KTN electro-optic deflector. Biomed Opt Express. 2017;8(8):3687-3699. Published 18 July 2017. doi:10.1364/BOE.8.003687
- Yao X, Gan Y, Chang E, Hibshoosh H, Feldman S, Hendon C. Visualization and tissue classification of human breast cancer images using ultrahigh-resolution OCT. Lasers Surg Med. 2017;49(3):258-269. doi:10.1002/lsm.22654
- Yu Gan, Xinwen Yao, Chang E, et al. Comparative study of texture features in OCT images at different scales for human breast tissue classification. Conf Proc IEEE Eng Med Biol Soc. 2016;2016:3926-3929. doi:10.1109/EMBC.2016.7591586
- Yao X, Gan Y, Marboe CC, Hendon CP. Myocardial imaging using ultrahigh-resolution spectral domain optical coherence tomography. J Biomed Opt. 2016;21(6):61006. doi:10.1117/1.JBO.21.6.061006
- Singh-Moon RP, Marboe CC, Hendon CP. Near-infrared spectroscopy integrated catheter for characterization of myocardial tissues: preliminary demonstrations to radiofrequency ablation therapy for atrial fibrillation. Biomed Opt Express. 2015;6(7):2494-2511. Published 12 June 2015. doi:10.1364/BOE.6.002494
- Gan Y, Yao W, Myers KM, Vink JY, Wapner RJ, Hendon CP. Analyzing three-dimensional ultrastructure of human cervical tissue using optical coherence tomography. Biomed Opt Express. 2015;6(4):1090-1108. Published 3 March 2015. doi:10.1364/BOE.6.001090
- Gan Y, Yao W, Myers KM, Hendon CP. An automated 3D registration method for optical coherence tomography volumes. Conf Proc IEEE Eng Med Biol Soc. 2014;2014:3873-3876. doi:10.1109/EMBC.2014.6944469
- Wang, Hui & Hendon, Christine & Rollins, Andrew. (2007). Ultrahigh-resolution optical coherence tomography at 1.15 μm using photonic crystal fiber with no zero-dispersion wavelengths. Optics Express - OPT EXPRESS. 15. doi:10.1364/OE.15.003085.
