= Dilhan Eryurt =

Turkish astrophysicist (1926–2012)

- Born: 29 November 1926; İzmir, Turkey
- Died: 13 September 2012 (aged 85); Ankara, Turkey
- Education: Istanbul University (BS); University of Michigan (MS); University of Ankara (PhD)
- Awards: Apollo Achievement Award; TÜBİTAK Science Award
- Scientific career
- Fields: Astrophysics (Heliology)
- Workplaces: Indiana University; Goethe Link Observatory; Goddard Institute for Space Studies; Middle East Technical University; NASA

Dilhan Eryurt (29 November 1926 – 13 September 2012) was a Turkish astrophysicist who made major contributions to scientific research on the formation and evolution of the Sun and other main sequence stars.

From 1961 to 1973, Eryurt worked for NASA, performing research for the Apollo program. She then established the astrophysics department at the Middle East Technical University (METU) in Turkey. She was the Dean of METU's science and arts faculty from 1988 to 1993.

== Early life ==
Eryurt was born on 29 November 1926 in İzmir, Turkey. Her father was Abidin Ege, who was a member of the Grand National Assembly of Turkey for Denizli Province in 1944.

Shortly after her birth in İzmir, Eryurt's family moved to Istanbul, and then to Ankara a few years later. After completing her primary education in Ankara, she continued to Ankara Girls' High School. In high school, she had a special interest in mathematics. For this reason, after graduating from high school, she enrolled in the Istanbul University Department of Mathematics and Astronomy. She pursued her interest in astronomy during her university studies.

== Career ==
After graduating from Istanbul University in 1946, Eryurt worked as an honorary assistant for two years for Tevfik Oktay Kabakçıoğlu. She was assigned to open an Astronomy Department at Ankara University. She continued her graduate studies at the University of Michigan, and in 1953 she completed her doctorate at the Ankara University Department of Astrophysics where she became associate professor.

In 1959, Eryurt went to Canada for two years on scholarship from the International Atomic Energy Agency. Here she worked with Alastair G. W. Cameron. Although she had learned mathematics in Turkey, she had not worked with computers. She studied books in Canada and the US, teaching herself how to make use of computers for her work. She then went to the US and worked for the Soroptimist Federation of America at Indiana University, and on the identification of stellar models at the Goethe Link Observatory, working with Marshall Wrubel. After this experience, Eryurt worked at NASA's Goddard Institute for Space Studies. She collaborated with Alastair G. W. Cameron, on research on solar evolution. During this period, she was the only woman astronomer working at the institution.

Eryurt's work at the Goddard Institute revealed some facts about the Sun that were not understood until then. The existing theory that the brightness of the Sun was much lower at its formation, 4.5 billion years ago, was under scrutiny. It was revealed that the Sun was actually much brighter and warmer in the past and decreased to its current level. The studies were important at that time to influence the course of scientific and engineering research aims of new space flights. She was awarded the Apollo Achievement Award in 1969 for her successful work contributing to the achievement of the Apollo 11 mission's first landing on the Moon and subsequent lunar exploration, by providing NASA engineers with crucial information for modelling solar impact on the lunar environment.

After completing her two-year research study at the Goddard Institute, Eryurt continued to work at the institute as a Senior Researcher. The institute sent her to the University of California to work on a research study about the formation and development of main sequence stars.

In 1968, she came to Turkey and organised the first National Astronomy Congress with the support of the Scientific and Technological Research Council of Turkey (TÜBİTAK).

Between 1969 and 1973, Eryurt continued her scientific research work at NASA. In 1973, she returned to the Middle East Technical University Physics Department and founded the Astrophysics Branch. In 1977, she was awarded with the TÜBİTAK Science Award. In 1988, she was Chairperson of the Physics Department for six months, and then became the Dean of the Faculty of Science and Literature for five years. She retired in 1993.

== Death ==
Eryurt died in Ankara from a heart attack on 13 September 2012 at the age of 85.

== Posthumous recognition ==
Eryurt was honoured with a Google Doodle on 20 July 2020 in commemoration of the 51st anniversary of the first human landing on the Moon by Neil Armstrong and Buzz Aldrin as part of the Apollo 11 mission.
