= Stephen Schneider (scientist) =

American climatologist (1945–2010)

Stephen H. Schneider
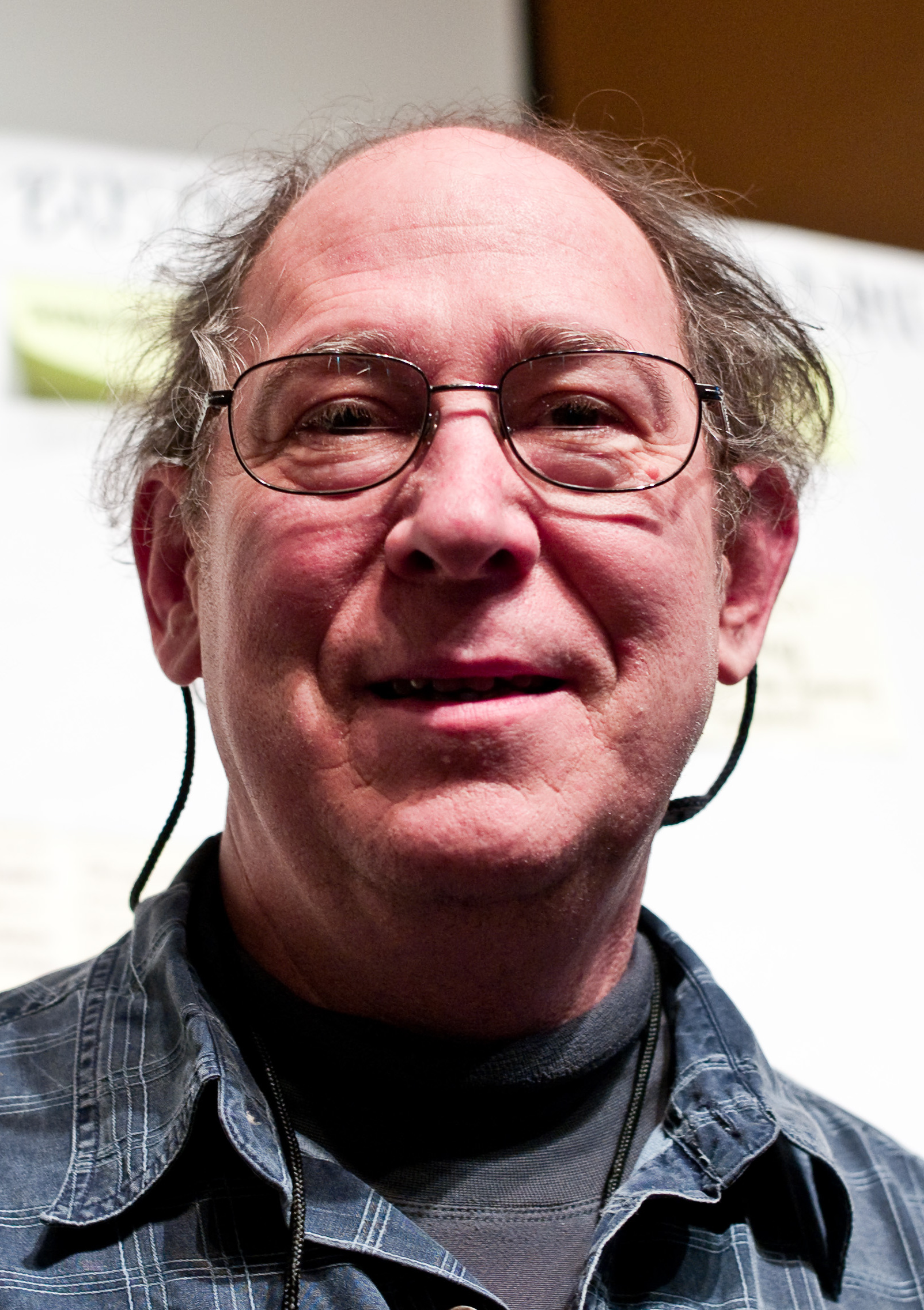
- Schneider in 2009
- Born: Stephen Henry Schneider; February 11, 1945; New York City, U.S.
- Died: July 19, 2010 (aged 65); London, England
- Education: Columbia University (BS, PhD)
- Known for: Climate change science, policy and education Founding editor of Climatic Change
- Awards: MacArthur Fellowship (1992); Elected to National Academy of Sciences (2002)
- Scientific career
- Fields: Climatology
- Workplaces: Stanford University
- Website: Home page

Stephen Henry Schneider (February 11, 1945 – July 19, 2010) was a professor of environmental biology and global change at Stanford University, a co-director at the Center for Environment Science and Policy of the Freeman Spogli Institute for International Studies and a senior fellow in the Stanford Woods Institute for the Environment. Schneider served as a consultant to federal agencies and White House staff in the Richard Nixon, Jimmy Carter, Ronald Reagan, George H. W. Bush, Bill Clinton, George W. Bush and Barack Obama administrations.

Schneider's research included modeling of the atmosphere, climate change, and the effect of global climate change on biological systems. Schneider was the founder and editor of the journal Climatic Change and authored or co-authored over 450 scientific papers and other publications. He was a coordinating lead author in Working Group II Intergovernmental Panel on Climate Change (IPCC) Third Assessment Report and was engaged as a co-anchor of the Key Vulnerabilities Cross-Cutting Theme for the Fourth Assessment Report (AR4) at the time of his death. During the 1980s, Schneider emerged as a leading public advocate of sharp reductions of greenhouse gas emissions to combat global warming. In 2006 Professor Schneider was an Adelaide Thinker in Residence advising the South Australian Government of Premier Mike Rann on climate change and renewable energy policies. In ten years South Australia went from zero to 31% of its electricity generation coming from renewables.

An annual award for outstanding climate science communication was created in Schneider's honor after his death, by the Commonwealth Club of California. The Stephen Schneider Memorial Lecture of the American Geophysical Union honors Schneider's life and work.

== Early work ==
Schneider grew up on Long Island, New York. He studied engineering at Columbia University, receiving his bachelor's degree in mechanical engineering in 1966. In 1971, he earned a Ph.D. in mechanical engineering and plasma physics. Schneider studied the role of greenhouse gases and suspended particulate material on climate as a postdoctoral fellow at NASA's Goddard Institute for Space Studies. Schneider was awarded the Marshall Scholarship.

In 1971, Schneider was second author on a Science paper with S. Ichtiaque Rasool titled "Atmospheric Carbon Dioxide and Aerosols: Effects of Large Increases on Global Climate" (Science 173, 138–141). This paper used a one-dimensional radiative transfer model to examine the competing effects of cooling from aerosols and warming from CO_{2}. The paper concluded that:

[I]t is projected that man's potential to pollute will increase six- to eightfold in the next 50 years. If this increased rate of injection of particulate matter in the atmosphere should raise the present background opacity by a factor of 4, our calculations suggest a decrease in global temperature by as much as 3.5 K. Such a large decrease in the average temperature of Earth, sustained over a period of few years, is believed to be sufficient to trigger an ice age. However, by that time, nuclear power may have largely replaced fossil fuels as a means of energy production.

Carbon dioxide was predicted to have only a minor role. However, the model was very simple and the calculation of the CO_{2} effect was lower than other estimates by a factor of about three, as noted in a footnote to the paper.

The story made headlines in The New York Times. Shortly afterwards, Schneider became aware that he had overestimated the cooling effect of aerosols, and underestimated the warming effect of CO_{2} by a factor of about three. He had mistakenly assumed that measurements of air particles he had taken near the source of pollution applied worldwide. He also found that much of the effect was due to natural aerosols which would not be affected by human activities, so the cooling effect of changes in industrial pollution would be much less than he had calculated. Having found that recalculation showed that global warming was the more likely outcome, he published a retraction of his earlier findings in 1974.

In a 1976 book The Genesis Strategy he discusses both long-term warming due to carbon dioxide and short-term cooling due to aerosols, and advocated for adopting policies that are resilient to future changes in climate.

== Media contributions ==
Schneider was a frequent contributor to commercial and noncommercial print and broadcast media on climate and environmental issues, e.g., Nova, Planet Earth, Nightline, Today Show, The Tonight Show, Bill Maher's shows, Good Morning America, Dateline, The Discovery Channel, as well as appearances on the British, Canadian and Australian Broadcasting Corporations.

Schneider commented about the frustrations and difficulties involved with assessing and communicating scientific ideas. In a January 2002 Scientific American article, he wrote:

I readily confess a lingering frustration: uncertainties so infuse the issue of climate change that it is still impossible to rule out either mild or catastrophic outcomes, let alone provide confident probabilities for all the claims and counterclaims made about environmental problems. Even the most credible international assessment body, the Intergovernmental Panel on Climate Change (IPCC), has refused to attempt subjective probabilistic estimates of future temperatures. This has forced politicians to make their own guesses about the likelihood of various degrees of global warming.

In 1989, Schneider addressed the challenge scientists face trying to communicate complex, important issues without adequate time during media interviews. This citation sometimes was used by his critics to accuse him of supporting misuse of science for political goals:

On the one hand, as scientists we are ethically bound to the scientific method, in effect promising to tell the truth, the whole truth, and nothing but — which means that we must include all the doubts, the caveats, the ifs, ands, and buts. On the other hand, we are not just scientists but human beings as well. And like most people we'd like to see the world a better place, which in this context translates into our working to reduce the risk of potentially disastrous climatic change. To do that we need to get some broadbased support, to capture the public's imagination. That, of course, entails getting loads of media coverage. So we have to offer up scary scenarios, make simplified, dramatic statements, and make little mention of any doubts we might have. This 'double ethical bind' we frequently find ourselves in cannot be solved by any formula. Each of us has to decide what the right balance is between being effective and being honest. I hope that means being both. (Quoted in Discover, pp. 45–48, October 1989.)

For the original, together with Schneider's commentary on its misrepresentation, see also American Physical Society, APS News August/September 1996.

== Honors ==
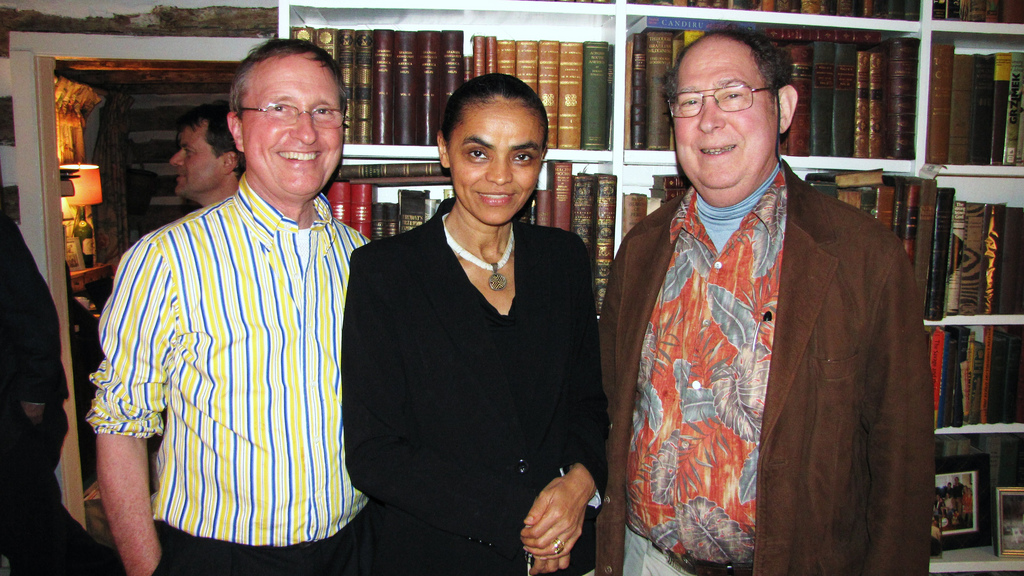
Schneider (right) with Thomas Lovejoy and Marina Silva

- 1991 AAAS Award for Public Understanding of Science and Technology
- 1992 MacArthur Fellowship
- 2002 Elected to the National Academy of Sciences
- Chair of the American Association for the Advancement of Science's Section on Atmospheric and Hydrospheric Sciences (1999–2001)
- The Intergovernmental Panel on Climate Change (IPCC), to which Schneider made very significant contributions, shared in the 2007 Nobel Peace Prize.

== Personal life ==
Schneider was married to the biologist Terry Root. Schneider was a survivor of an aggressive cancer, mantle cell lymphoma. He documented his struggle to conquer the condition, including applying his own knowledge of science to design his own treatment regime, in a self-published 2005 book, The Patient from Hell. He died unexpectedly on July 19, 2010, after suffering a pulmonary embolism while returning from a scientific meeting in Käringön, Sweden.

== Selected publications ==
- Michael D. Mastrandrea; Stephen H. Schneider (October 2010). Preparing for Climate Change. MIT Press. ISBN 978-0-262-01488-5.
- Stephen H. Schneider, Tim Flannery introduction (2009) Science as a Contact Sport: Inside the Battle to Save the Earth's Climate. National Geographic Society (November 3, 2009) ISBN 978-1-4262-0540-8
- Stephen H. Schneider, James R. Miller, Eileen Crist and Penelope J. Boston (Eds, 2008). Scientists debate Gaia: the next century. Cambridge: The MIT Press. ISBN 978-0-2621-9498-3
- Stephen H. Schneider, Janica Lane (2005) The Patient from Hell: How I Worked with My Doctors to Get the Best of Modern Medicine and How You Can Too. Da Capo Lifelong Books.
- Stephen H. Schneider, Armin Rosencranz, John O. Niles (eds., 2002), Climate Change Policy: A Survey, Island Press, 368 pp; June 2002.
- Stephen H. Schneider and Terry L. Root (Editors, 2001), Wildlife Responses to Climate Change: North American Case Studies, Island Press; December 2001.
- Stephen H. Schneider (1997), Laboratory Earth: the Planetary Gamble We Can't Afford to Lose, HarperCollins; January 1997
- Stephen H. Schneider (editor, 1996), Encyclopedia of Climate and Weather, Oxford University Press; May 1996.
- Stephen H. Schneider, Penelope J. Boston (Eds, 1992), Scientists on Gaia, MIT Press; February 1992
- Stephen H. Schneider (1989), Global Warming: Are We Entering the Greenhouse Century?, Sierra Club Books; October 1989
- Stephen H. Schneider, Randi Londer (1984), Coevolution of Climate and Life, Sierra Club Books; May 1984
- Stephen H. Schneider, Lynne E. Mesirow (1976), The Genesis Strategy: Climate and Global Survival, Plenum Pub Corp; April 1976.

== See also ==
- Point Paterson Desalination Plant
- Politics of global warming
