= Stephen Self =

British-American volcanologist

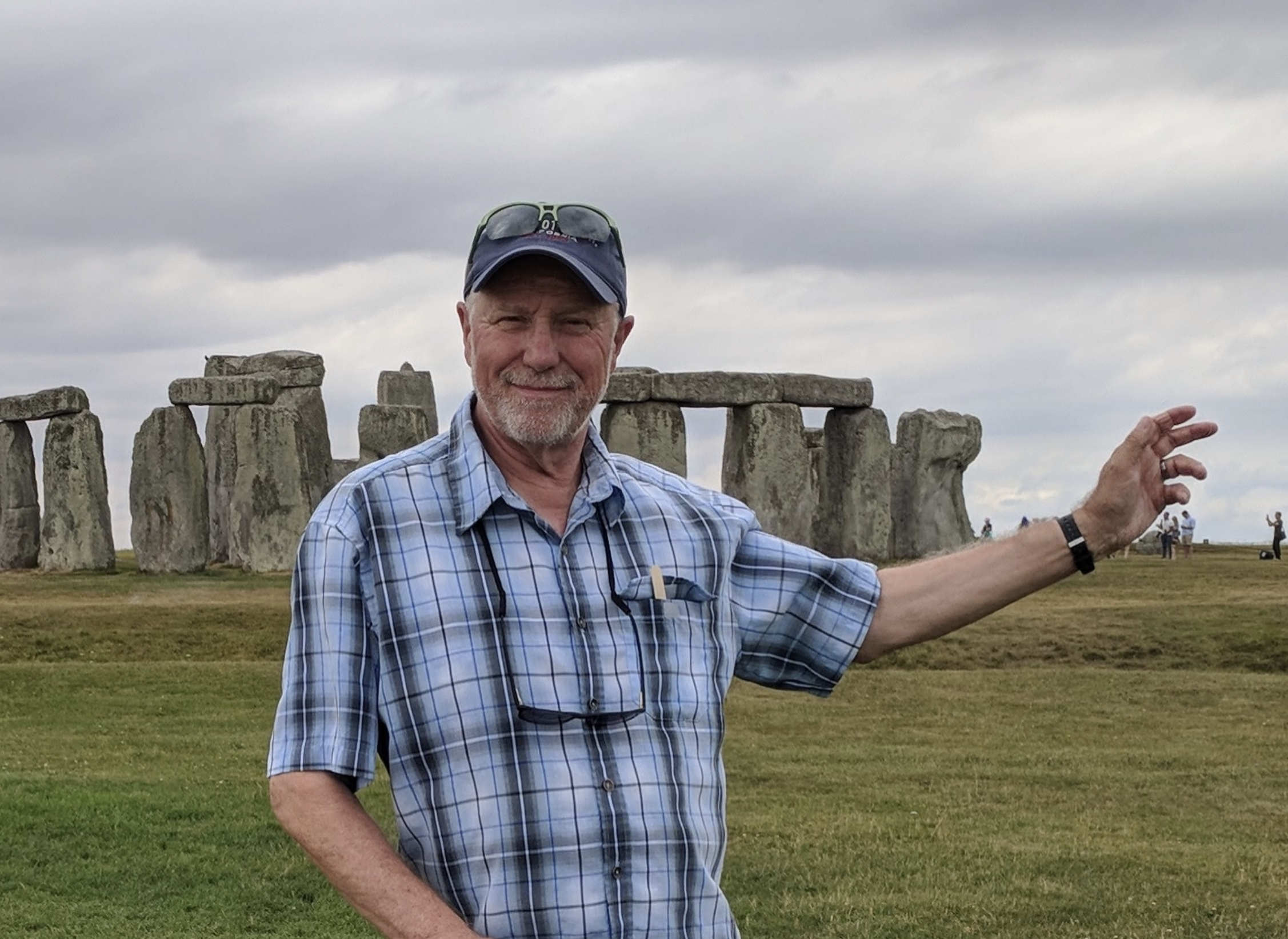
- Stephen Self
- Education: University of Leeds (BSc, 1970); Imperial College (PhD, 1974)
- Known for: Climate impacts of volcanism; flood basalts and supereuptions.
- Scientific career
- Fields: Volcanologist
- Workplaces: Arizona State University; University of Texas, Arlington; University of Hawaiʻi at Mānoa; Open University; Nuclear Regulatory Commission
- Doctoral advisor: George P.L. Walker

Stephen Self is an American volcanologist (born in Britain), best known for his work on large igneous provinces, explosive eruptions, and on the global impacts of volcanism.

== Education and career ==
Self graduated from Leeds University in 1970, with a BSc in geology. He then went to Imperial College to study for a PhD on the recent volcanology of Terceira Island, Azores, supervised by George P. L. Walker. After completing his PhD thesis in 1974, Self moved to New Zealand as a post-doctoral fellow at Victoria University, Wellington, before moving to the United States as a NASA Research Fellow at Dartmouth College and the NASA Goddard Institute for Space Studies (1977–1979). He was Assistant Professor at Arizona State University from 1979 to 1983, and later Associate Professor and then Professor at University of Texas, Arlington from 1983 to 1990. In 1990, Self moved to the University of Hawaiʻi at Mānoa, Honolulu as a Professor of Geology and Geophysics, before returning to the UK in 2001 as Chair in Volcanology at The Open University. From 2008 to 2018, Self worked for the US Nuclear Regulatory Commission as Senior Volcanologist. He is currently adjunct Professor in Department of Earth and Planetary Science at University of California, Berkeley.

== Contributions ==
Self has made foundational contributions to understanding large volcanic eruptions and their impacts on the environment. Working with Christopher G. Newhall, he conceived the Volcanic Explosivity Index in 1982 which remains the most widely used comparator of eruption sizes (2,400 citations in Google Scholar). With Michael R. Rampino, Self established links between large explosive volcanic eruptions and climate and, in particular, the sulfur injected into the atmosphere. Self also established links between large effusive eruptions and climate for flood basalt provinces including the Deccan Traps and Columbia River. With Thorvaldur Thordarsson, he has also written extensively on the Icelandic eruption of Laki, 1783-1784, and on the emplacement and inflation of large basaltic lava flows. Working with Stephen Sparks and George Walker, he provided foundational models on how large explosive eruption deposits form and are interpreted. He has published studies on the largest Quaternary eruptions and their interactions with landscapes, hazards, and climate including the 1991 Mt. Pinatubo, 1815 Tambora, 1883 Krakatau, and Toba (74,000 years ago) eruptions among others. In 1979, he was the first scientist of the modern era to visit Tambora volcano, in Indonesia—site of the largest and most deadly eruption of the past 750 years which led to the infamous 'Year without a Summer' of 1816.

== Service and recognition ==
Self was Vice-President of the International Association of Volcanology and Chemistry of the Earth's Interior from 2011-2015. In 2012, he was elected Fellow of the American Geophysical Union; an honor which recognizes 'individual members who have made exceptional scientific contributions and attained acknowledged eminence'. He was elected Fellow of the Geological Society of America in 1986.
