= Geoff Wadge =

British volcanologist (1949–2026)

- Born: Geoffrey Wadge; 19 September 1949; Burnley, Lancashire, England
- Died: 7 May 2026 (aged 76)
- Education: Imperial College London (B.Sc.) 1971; Imperial College London (PhD) 1974
- Awards: Murchison Medal (2015)
- Scientific career
- Workplaces: University of the West Indies; University of Reading
- Thesis: Volcanic deformation and the eruptive mechanisms of Mount Etna (1974)
- Doctoral advisor: George P.L. Walker

Geoffrey Wadge (19 September 1949 – 7 May 2026) was a British volcanologist, best known for his work on the remote sensing of volcanoes and volcanic eruptions, and for his 1987 work anticipating the hazards of a future eruption of the Soufriere Hills Volcano, Montserrat. Wadge was awarded the Murchison Medal of the Geological Society of London in 2015.

== Life and career ==
Geoffrey Wadge was born on 19 September 1949 in Burnley, Lancashire, England, where he also grew up. He studied geology at Imperial College as an undergraduate, from 1968 to 1971. In 1969, Wadge led an Imperial College expedition to Iceland along with geology student Steve Sparks, and mining geology students Ian Boughton and Clive Newall. Wadge subsequently completed a PhD on Mount Etna in 1974, under the supervision of George Walker. Wadge later taught at the University of the West Indies (Mona campus), and undertook research at the Seismic Research Unit, Trinidad, and at the LPI Houston, before taking up employment at the University of Reading, where he spent the rest of his career.

In 1987, while he was a research fellow at the SRU, Wadge published an analysis with Michael Isaacs on the impacts of a future eruption of the Soufriere Hills Volcano on Montserrat. Montserrat was not at that stage showing any signs of unrest, but his work proved to be remarkably prescient after an eruption began on Montserrat in 1995. The Wadge and Isaacs report became a focal point in 1997 and 1998, when the UK parliament's select committee on international development held an investigation into the preparedness of the UK and Montserrat governments for an eruption on Montserrat.

Wadge later spent some time as the chair of the scientific advisory committee, advising the government of Montserrat on the status of the volcanic eruption.

== Death ==
Wadge died on 7 May 2026, aged 76.

== Awards ==
In 2015, Wadge was awarded the Murchison Medal of the Geological Society of London, in recognition of his major contributions to geology and remote sensing.

== Key publications ==
- Wadge, G. and Isaacs, M.C., 1987, Volcanic Hazards from the Soufrière Hills Volcano, Montserrat West Indies. A Report to the Government of Montserrat and the Pan Caribbean Disaster Preparedness and Prevention Project. Reading: Department of Geography, University of Reading.
- Wadge, G., Robertson, R.E.A. and Voight, B., eds., The Eruption of Soufriere Hills Volcano, Montserrat from 2000 to 2010, Geological Society of London Memoir 39.
