= Richard Stothers =

American astronomer and planetary scientist

Richard B.Stothers
- Born: 1939; United States
- Died: June 28, 2011; New York City, US
- Education: Harvard University (PhD) Princeton University (BS)
- Scientific career
- Fields: Astrophysics; Solar physics; Climate science
- Institutions: Goddard Institute for Space Studies

Richard Stothers was an astronomer and planetary scientist with the Goddard Institute for Space Studies, which he joined in June 1961 as a graduate student. Within two years, he had received his Ph.D. from Harvard and became a permanent staff member of the institute, where he spent the remainder of his career. He contributed to the modern understanding of the origin and evolution of stars and, later in life, to climate science. He was able to read original papers in several languages, which allowed him to extract information on historical climate change from ancient writings. Stothers also examined ancient reports of unidentified flying objects and examined the factual basis for myths of "giant serpents".

Stothers was raised in New York and graduated from Phillips Exeter Academy. He was a member of the Cum Laude Society. He attended college at Princeton, where he was a member of the fencing team, and majored in mathematics. His thesis was entitled “The Problem of Pulsating Stellar Models.”

Stothers was an author on at least 196 scientific papers during his career, stretching from 1963 to 2012.
