= New York City Panel on Climate Change =

New York Climate Change organization

The New York City Panel on Climate Change (NPCC) was convened by Mayor Michael Bloomberg in August 2008 as part of PlaNYC and codified into law in 2012 by New York City Local Law 42. It is an independent advisory body of researchers who advise New York City about climate change, producing reports that provide short-, intermediate- and long-term projections for the city. The NPCC reports have also included chapters on coastal flooding, public health, energy insecurity, and equity, among other topics.

== The panel ==
Many leading Earth scientists from the region and researchers from Goddard Institute for Space Studies (GISS) were part of the panel's work since its beginning. Among them Cynthia Rosenzweig, who helped pioneer the study of climate change and agriculture, who was a co-chair for the first iteration of the panel along with William Solecki, founding director of the CUNY Institute for Sustainable Cities. Additionally, legal, insurance, and risk management experts are part of the NPCC.

== Reports ==
- The first report NPCC1 was published in 2010, about adaptation and risk management response.
- The second report NPCC2 was published in 2013, about climate risk, based on observations, climate change projections, and maps.
- The third report NPCC3 was published in 2015, and provides climate projections until 2100.
- Another report, NPCC 2019, was published in March 2019 and provides an updated analysis of the projections made with data collected in 2015, as well as an exposition of particular at-risk communities in New York City.
- The fourth report NPCC4 was published in April 2024.

== See also ==
- IPCC
