= William B. Rossow =

American atmospheric scientist

William B. Rossow is an American atmospheric scientist, who was for many years the head of the International Satellite Cloud Climatology Project. He is currently a distinguished professor at City College of New York, and also a published author. He is a Fellow of the American Geophysical Union and American Mathematical Society.
