= Gary Yohe =

American economist

- Born: 1948 (age 77–78)

Academic background
- Education: Yale University
- Influences: William Nordhaus

Academic work
- Discipline: Environmental economics
- School or tradition: Environmental economics
- Institutions: Wesleyan University
- Awards: Wesleyan Prize for Excellence in Research

Gary W. Yohe is an American economist and environmental economist who is professor emeritus of economics and environmental studies at Wesleyan University. His research has focused on environmental and natural-resource economics, climate-change economics, risk assessment, adaptation, mitigation, and the economic effects of climate change. He has been involved with the Intergovernmental Panel on Climate Change (IPCC) since the early 1990s and shared the 2007 Nobel Peace Prize as a senior member of the IPCC.

== Early life and education ==
Yohe studied mathematics at the University of Pennsylvania, receiving a B.A. in 1970. He subsequently earned an M.A. in mathematics from the State University of New York at Stony Brook in 1971. He studied economics at Yale University, receiving an M.Phil. in 1974 and a Ph.D. in 1975. His doctoral dissertation concerned comparing the efficiencies of price and quantity controls under uncertainty; it formed the basis for several of his early publications in economics and translated into carbon tax versus cap-and-trade when he turned his attention to climate policy.

== Academic career ==
Yohe began his academic career as an assistant professor of economics at the State University of New York at Albany from 1975 to 1977. He joined Wesleyan University in 1977 as an assistant professor and subsequently served as associate professor and professor of economics. He held visiting appointments multiple times in the economics department at Yale University and later at the Yale School of Forestry and Environmental Studies. He was also a visiting participant in a Princeton University research community on communicating uncertainty in climate change policy from 2012 to 2013.

At Wesleyan, Yohe also served as director of the Andrus Center for Public Affairs and director of Research and Sponsored Programs for the university. In 2010, he was named the Huffington Foundation Professor of Economics and Environmental Studies at Wesleyan. He became professor emeritus after his retirement from the university in 2019.

== Climate-change research ==
Yohe began working on climate change in the early 1980s after being invited to participate in a National Academies study by economist William Nordhaus. The experience opened a new and emerging field of research to which he would devote most of his academic career. His subsequent research would examine the economic consequences of climate change and the design of responses to climate risks, including mitigation, adaptation, uncertainty, and iterative risk management.

A significant part of his research focuses on the development of approaches for assessing climate risks beyond conventional economic cost-benefit measures. He contributed to the creation of theIPCC's framework of "reasons for concern," which assess climate risks across several categories, including threats to unique and threatened systems, extreme climate events, and large-scale disruptions. The framework became a recurring component of IPCC assessments and served as a productive framing with which to organize climate research around the world.

Yohe also worked on the detection and attribution of climate-change impacts. His 2003 paper with Camille Parmesan, published in Nature, examined patterns of biological changes across natural systems and their relationship to observed climate trends.

His work has also addressed adaptation and mitigation capacity, coastal and sea-level risks, stabilization targets, and the treatment of uncertainty in climate policy. He has argued for iterative risk-management approaches that consider both the likelihood and consequences of climate impacts rather than relying exclusively on economic valuation. His research contributed to the development of risk-management approaches that have been adopted by decisionmakers around the world since its publication as a consensus finding of the IPCC in its 2007 Fourth Assessment Report.

Yohe was a lead author for four chapters of the Third Assessment Report, a convening lead author for multiple chapters in two working groups and a member of the core writing team for the Synthesis Report of all three working groups for the Fourth Assessment, and a lead or coordinating author for two chapters of the Fifth Assessment Report.

== Public and professional service ==
Yohe served as vice chair of the National Climate Assessment Development and Advisory Committee for the Third National Climate Assessment under President Obama; its report was released by the White House in the summer of 2014. He has also served on various panels and committees for the National Academies and National Aeronautics and Space Administration dealing with climate adaptation, stabilization targets for greenhouse-gas concentrations, global environmental change, the human dimensions of global change, and the value of earth observation missions. He was a member of the New York City Panel on Climate Change and continues to serve in editorial roles, including as coeditor-in-chief of the journal Climatic Change.

Since May 2025, Yohe and six colleagues from his IPCC days have maintained a Substack presence with more than 1,000 subscribers. It is called climatecafe.substack.com, and its mission is “create a place for discussion of the climate system, the reality and seriousness of climate change, and efforts to control greenhouse emissions and increase resilience to mounting climate-driven economic and social risks.” Yohe has also published books and edited volumes on economics and climate change, including Avoiding Dangerous Climate Change (2006), and has written extensively for academic and public audiences on climate policy and risk.

== Awards and honors ==
- Shared the 2007 Nobel Peace Prize as a member of the IPCC.
- Elected to the Connecticut Academy of Science and Engineering.
- Elected a member-at-large of Sigma Xi.
- Received Wesleyan University's first Prize for Excellence in Research in 2018.
