= Drew Shindell =

Climatologist

Drew Todd Shindell is a physicist and a climate specialist and professor at Duke University's Nicholas School of the Environment. He is listed as an ISI Highly Cited Researcher. He was a chapter lead (coordinating lead author) of the Intergovernmental Panel on Climate Change (IPCC) October 8, 2018 Special Report on Global Warming of 1.5 °C as well as on the Intergovernmental Panel on Climate Change's Fifth Assessment Report in 2013. He has testified on climate issues before both houses of the US Congress, at the request of both parties. His research concerns natural and human drivers of climate change, linkages between air quality and climate change, and the interface between climate change science and policy. He has been an author on more than 200 peer-reviewed publications and received awards from Scientific American, NASA, the EPA, and the NSF.

He was also a leading scientific contributor to the establishment of the Climate and Clean Air Coalition, a group of now more than 60 nations along with many intergovernmental and non-governmental organization dedicated to implementing actions that simultaneously reduce air pollution and mitigate climate change. He chaired the 2011 Integrated Assessment of Black Carbon and Tropospheric Ozone produced by the United Nations Environment Programme and World Meteorological Organization that, along with the paper in Science he led in 2012 entitled "Simultaneously Mitigating Near-Term Climate Change and Improving Human Health and Food Security" helped to catalyze the Coalition's formation. He has served as Chair of the Science Advisory Panel to the Coalition since 2012.

He has addressed the UN Framework Convention on Climate Change, the World Bank, federal and state officials, developed a climate change course with the American Museum of Natural History, and made numerous appearances in newspapers, on radio, and on TV as part of his public outreach efforts. In 2023, Dr. Shindell was elected to the National Academy of Sciences.

== Education and Employment ==
Shindell is a physicist who got his B.A. at University of California at Berkeley in 1988 and his Ph.D. at the State University of New York in Stony Brook in 1995. From 2000 to 2014 he was a climatologist at the NASA Goddard Institute for Space Studies in New York City. While there, Dr. Shindell taught atmospheric chemistry at nearby Columbia University for more than a decade. In 2014 he was named Professor of Climate Sciences at Duke University, where he was appointed the Nicholas Professor of Earth Sciences in 2016.

== Research interests ==
His research is concerned with global climate change, climate variability, atmospheric chemistry and air pollution. He uses climate models to investigate chemical changes such as air pollution, climate changes such as global warming, and the connections between these two. Among his research interests are:

- Long-term changes in climate and climate variability patterns
- Sensitivity of climate change to different drivers
- Climate and air quality linkages and public policy
- Interdisciplinary assessment of the impact of policy options on climate, public health, food and the economy
- Atmospheric composition changes and solar power generation

== Selected publications ==
- Shindell et al: Quantified, Localized Health Benefits of Accelerated Carbon Dioxide Emissions Reductions. In: Nature Climate Change 8, (2018), 291-291, https://doi.org/10.1038/s41558-018-0108-y.
- Bergin et al: Large reductions in solar energy production due to dust and particulate air pollution. In: Environmental Science and Technology 4, (2017), 339-344, doi:10.1021/acs.estlett.7b00197.
- Shindell et al: A climate policy pathway for near- and long-term benefits, In: Science 356, No. 6337, (2017), 493-494, doi:10.1126/science.aak9521.
- Shindell et al: The Social Cost of Methane: Theory and Applications. In: Faraday Discussions 200, (2017), 429-451, doi:10.1039/C7FD00009J.
- Shindell et al: Climate and health impacts of US emissions reductions consistent with 2 °C. In: Nature Climate Change 6, (2016), 503–507, doi:10.1038/nclimate2935.
- Bond et al: Bounding the role of black carbon in the climate system: A scientific assessment. In: Journal of Geophysical Research 118, Issue 11, (2013), 5380–5552, doi:10.1002/jgrd.50171.
- Shindell et al, Simultaneously Mitigating Near-Term Climate Change and Improving Human Health and Food Security. In: Science 335, No. 6065, (2012), 183-189, doi:10.1126/science.1210026.
- Gray et al, Solar Influence on Climate. In: Reviews of Geophysics 48, Issue 4, (2010), doi:10.1029/2009RG000282.
- Lamarque et al, Historical (1850–2000) gridded anthropogenic and biomass burning emissions of reactive gases and aerosols: methodology and application. In: Atmospheric Chemistry and Physics 10, (2010), 7017-7039, doi:10.5194/acp-10-7017-2010.
- Steig et al, Warming of the Antarctic ice-sheet surface since the 1957 International Geophysical Year. In: Nature 457, (2009), 459-462, doi:10.1038/nature07669.
- Michael E. Mann et al, Global Signatures and Dynamical Origins of the Little Ice Age and Medieval Climate Anomaly. In: Science 326, No. 5957, (2009), 1256-1260, doi:10.1126/science.1177303.
- Shindell et al, Improved Attribution of Climate Forcing to Emissions. In: Science 326, No. 5953, (2009), 716-718, doi:10.1126/science.1174760.
- Hansen et al, Efficacy of climate forcings. In: Journal of Geophysical Research 110, D18, (2005), doi:10.1029/2005JD005776.
- Shindell et al, Solar Forcing of Regional Climate Change During the Maunder Minimum. In: Science 294, No. 5549, (2001), 2149-2152, doi:10.1126/science.1064363.
- Shindell et al, Solar Cycle Variability, Ozone, and Climate. In: Science 284, No. 5412, (1999), 305-308, doi:10.1126/science.284.5412.305.
- Shindell et al, Simulation of recent northern winter climate trends by greenhouse-gas forcing. In: Nature 399, (1998), 452-455, doi:10.1038/20905.
- Shindell et al, Increased polar stratospheric ozone losses and delayed eventual recovery owing to increasing greenhouse-gas concentrations. In: Nature 392, (1998), 589-592, doi:10.1038/33385.
