= Cynthia Rosenzweig =

American agronomist and climatologist

Cynthia E. Rosenzweig
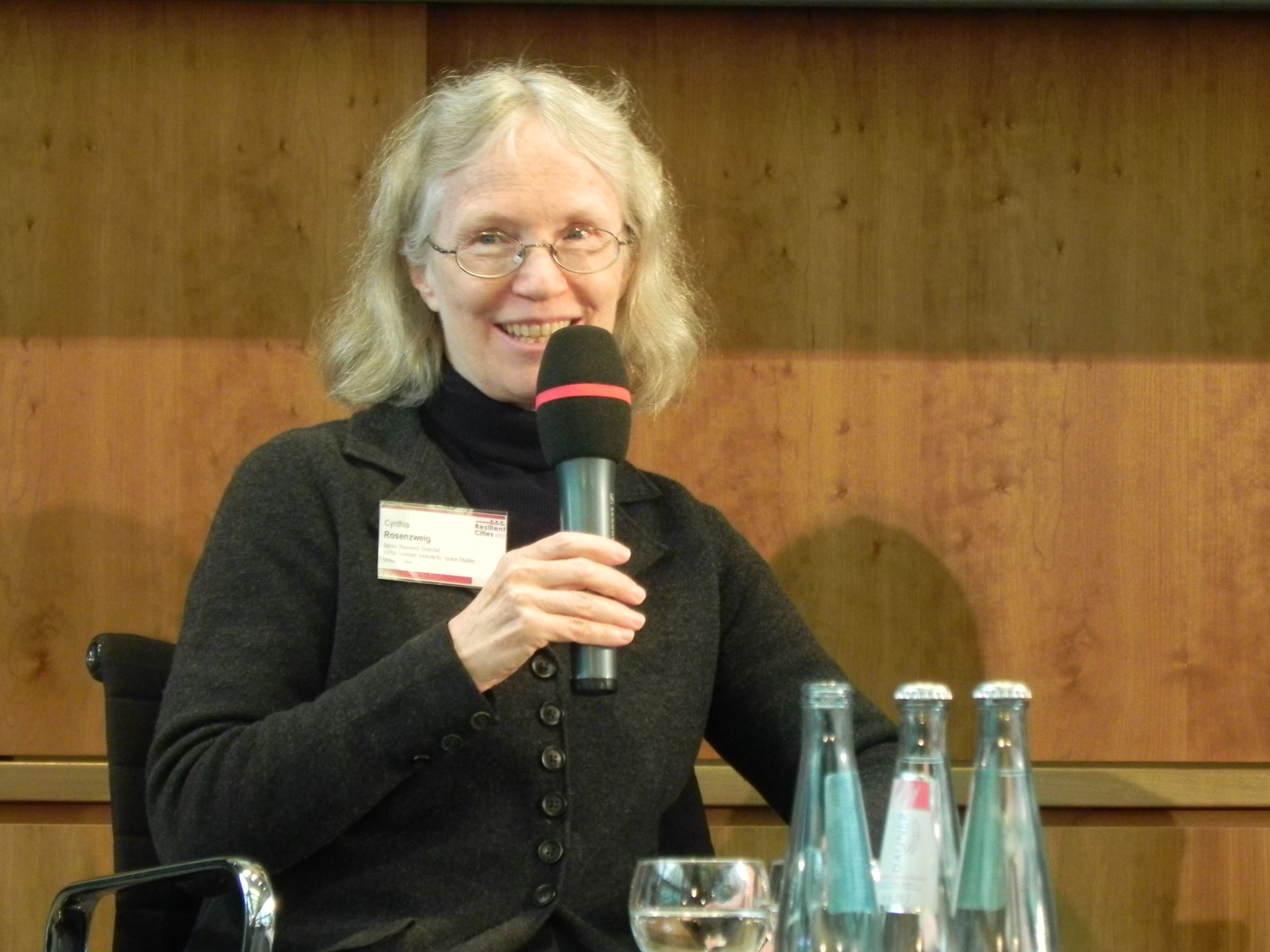
- Cynthia E. Rosenzweig at Goddard Institute for Space Studies, New York.
- Born: 1958 (age 67–68)
- Citizenship: American
- Education: Rutgers University University of Massachusetts Amherst
- Known for: Helped pioneer the study of climate change and agriculture
- Scientific career
- Workplaces: Goddard Institute for Space Studies Barnard College Columbia Climate School
- Thesis: Potential effects of increased atmospheric carbon dioxide and climate change on thermal and water regimes affecting wheat and corn production in the Great Plains (1991)
- Website: www.giss.nasa.gov/staff/crosenzweig.html

Cynthia E. Rosenzweig (née Ropes) (born c. 1958) is an American agronomist and climatologist at NASA Goddard Institute for Space Studies, located at Columbia University, "who helped pioneer the study of climate change and agriculture." She is an adjunct senior research scientist at the Columbia Climate School and has over 300 publications, over 80 peer-reviewed articles, has authored or edited eight books. She has also served in many different organizations working to develop plans to manage climate change, at the global level with the IPCC as well as in New York City after Hurricane Sandy.

== Education and academic career ==
Rosenzweig attended Cook College (at Rutgers University) earning a Bachelor of Arts degree in agricultural sciences in 1980. Rosenzweig's focus on agriculture began in 1969, when she and her future husband rented and operated a farm in Tuscany, Italy, picking grapes and olives and raising animals like goats, pigs, ducks, and geese. She decided to return to university to study agriculture, earning a Master of Science degree in Soils and Crops from Rutgers University in 1983. During her Master's, she was hired by NASA Goddard Institute for Space Studies to study cropland using satellite data. She then earned her Ph.D. from the University of Massachusetts Amherst in Plant, Soil and Environmental Sciences in 1991.

She has continued working for NASA, where she has been the head of the Climate Impacts Group since 1993. Her work with the IPCC Task Force on Data was recognized when the 2007 Nobel Peace Prize was awarded jointly to Al Gore and the IPCC.

She also currently serves as an adjunct professor at Barnard College, where she leads the Climate Impacts research group, and is also an adjunct senior research scientist at the Columbia Climate School at Columbia University.

== Climate research ==
Rosenzweig has been a leader in the field of food and climate change research since the early 1980s. She has led large-scale interdisciplinary research studies on the impacts of climate change in both rural and urban settings. Her research has shaped how we understand the close relationship between food and climate change, most notably predicting the impacts of the interaction between climate and food systems. Rosenzweig's research has been used by thousands of decision-makers in more than 90 countries in their efforts to mitigate and adapt to climate change. She is also the founder of the Agricultural Model Intercomparison and Improvement Project (AgMIP), a global and interdisciplinary network of over one thousand researchers studying climate and food systems modeling.

== Community engagement and advocacy ==
While at NASA and Columbia's Goddard Institute for Space Studies, Rosenzweig has pioneered the study of climate change's impact on agriculture and human cities. She has been involved in numerous working groups attempting to assess and establish plans for managing climate change, including:

- Co-chair, New York City Panel on Climate Change
- Co-Leader, Metropolitan East Coast Regional Assessment of the U.S. National Assessment of the Potential Consequences of Climate Variability and Change, sponsored by the U.S. Global Change Research Program
- Coordinating Lead Author of the IPCC Working Group II Fourth Assessment Report ("Observed Changes" chapter)
- Coordinating Lead Author of the IPCC Special Report on Climate Change and Land
- Member, IPCC Task Group on Data and Scenarios for Impact and Climate Assessment
- Co-Editor, UCCRN First Assessment Report on Climate Change and Cities (ARC3).
- Panel member of the New York City Panel on Climate Change.
- Co-founder and member of the executive committee of the Agricultural Model Intercomparison and Improvement Project (AgMIP)
- On October 20, 2022, Rosenzweig was awarded the World Food Prize.
- Rosenzweig founded the Agricultural Model Intercomparison and Improvement Project in 2010

== Publications ==
An overview of Rosenzweig's research can be obtained at her Google Scholar profile. A complete list of her publications can be obtained from her bibliography on the NASA Goodard Institute for Space Studies website.

- Rosenzweig, C.; Parry, M. L. (1994). "Potential impact of climate change on world food supply". Nature. 367 (6459): 133. Bibcode:1994Natur.367..133R. doi:10.1038/367133a0. S2CID 4320662.
- C.L. Rosenzweig & M.L. Parry, "Climate Change and Agriculture", 1990
- Rosenzweig, C.; Karoly, D.; Vicarelli, M.; Neofotis, P.; Wu, Q.; Casassa, G.; Menzel, A.; Root, T. L.; Estrella, N.; Seguin, B.; Tryjanowski, P.; Liu, C.; Rawlins, S.; Imeson, A. (2008). "Attributing physical and biological impacts to anthropogenic climate change". Nature. 453 (7193): 353–357. Bibcode:2008Natur.453..353R. doi:10.1038/nature06937. PMID 18480817. S2CID 2774470.
- Testimony before Congress, April 17, 2007.
- Rosenzweig, C., C.Z. Mutter, and E.M. Contreras (Eds.), 2021: Handbook of Climate Change and Agroecosystems: Climate Change and Farming System Planning in Africa and South Asia: AgMIP Stakeholder-driven Research. Series on Climate Change Impacts, Adaptation, and Mitigation, Vol. 5. World Scientific, doi:10.1142/q0259.
- Rosenzweig, C., M. Parry, and M. De Mel (Eds.), 2022: Our Warming Planet: Climate Change Impacts and Adaptation: Lectures in Climate Change, Vol. 2. World Scientific, doi:10.1142/12312.

== Awards ==
- Guggenheim Fellow
- GSFC Honor Award - Science (2011)
- GISS Best Publication Award (2009)
- GSFC Honor Award - Earth Science Achievement (2007)
- Fellow, American Association for the Advancement of Science (2006)
- Named as one of Nature's 10: Ten People Who Mattered in 2012" by the journal Nature
- World Food Prize (2022)
- NASA Blue Marble Award (2024)
