= Aglaonice =

Ancient Thessalian witch

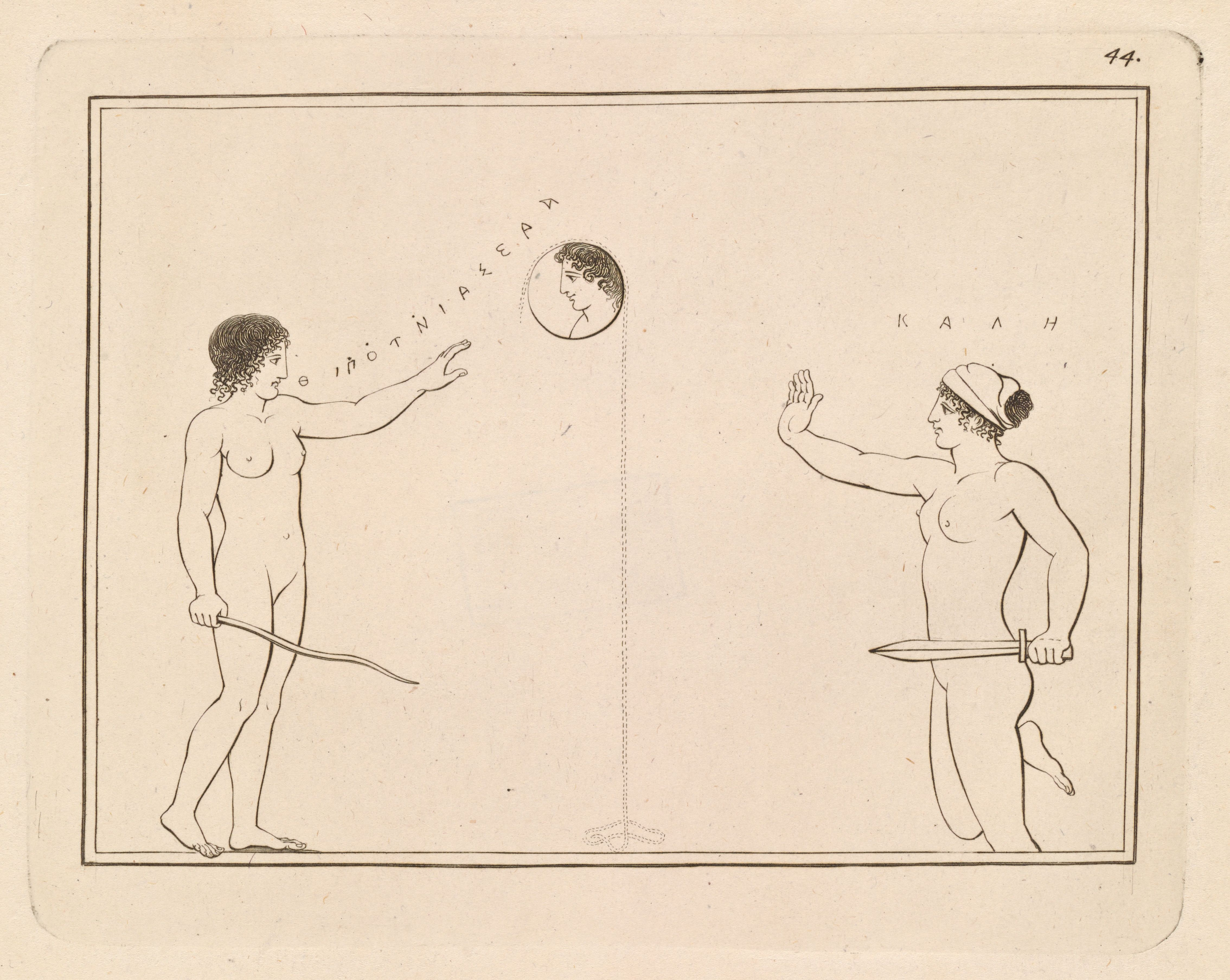
Greek vase from the collection of William Hamilton, apparently showing two women drawing down the moon.

Aglaonice (Ancient Greek: Ἀγλαονίκη, Aglaoníkē, compound of αγλαὸς (aglaòs) "luminous" and νίκη (nikē) "victory") was an ancient Thessalian witch, known from a scholion on the Argonautica and two references in Plutarch's Moralia. She was the daughter of Hegetor or Hegemon. Her date is uncertain, but she may have been active some time between the mid-third century BC and the late-first century AD. However, Richard Stothers suggests that Aglaonice might have been mythical, or a pre-fifth century figure about whom legends had developed by the time of Plutarch.

Thessalian witches were famous for their ability to draw down the moon from the sky. Both Plutarch and the scholiast on the Argonautica claim that Aglaonice was able to predict lunar eclipses, and planned her drawing down of the moon to coincide with them. As during a normal lunar eclipse the moon remains visible, Peter Bicknell proposed that during Aglaonice's lifetime there were particularly dark eclipses, which would explain how her ability to predict eclipses would help make the illusion of drawing down the moon convincing. However, Bicknell's theory has been criticised both on the grounds of its astronomical implausibility, and for over-literally interpreting ancient literary evidence.

According to the scholiast on the Argonautica, Aglaonice's drawing down of the moon was the source of the proverb "pull the moon against yourself", meaning to bring misfortune upon yourself. The scholiast explains that when Aglaonice claimed to draw down the moon, she "immediately fell into calamities, losing one of her kin".

== Cultural influence ==
One of the craters on Venus is named after Aglaonice. She is one of the 999 mythical or historical figures featured on Judy Chicago's Heritage Floor, associated with the place-setting for Aspasia in The Dinner Party. Her name is also given to one of the characters, depicted by Juliette Gréco, in Jean Cocteau's 1950 film "Orpheus".

== See also ==
- Timeline of women in science
