= World Glacier Monitoring Service =

International research organization

Example of data provided by the WGMS: Glacier annual mass change for reference glaciers

The World Glacier Monitoring Service (WGMS) was started in 1986, combining the two former services PSFG (Permanent Service on Fluctuations of Glaciers) and TTS/WGI (Temporal Technical Secretary/World Glacier Inventory). It is a service of the International Association of the Cryospheric Sciences of the International Union of Geodesy and Geophysics (IACS, IUGG) as well as of the World Data System of the International Council for Science (WDS, ICSU) and works under the auspices of the United Nations Environment Programme (UNEP), the United Nations Educational, Scientific and Cultural Organisation (UNESCO), and the World Meteorological Organization (WMO)

The WGMS is based at a centre at the University of Zurich in Switzerland, and the Director of the Service is Michael Zemp. It is supported by the United Nations Environment Programme.

WGMS "collects standardised observations on changes in mass, volume, area and length of glaciers with time (glacier fluctuations), as well as statistical information on the distribution of perennial surface ice in space (glacier inventories). Such glacier fluctuation and inventory data are high priority key variables in climate system monitoring; they form a basis for hydrological modelling with respect to possible effects of atmospheric warming, and provide fundamental information in glaciology, glacial geomorphology and quaternary geology. Such glacier fluctuation and inventory data are high priority key variables in climate system monitoring; they form a basis for hydrological modelling with respect to possible effects of atmospheric warming, and provide fundamental information in glaciology, glacial geomorphology and quaternary geology. The highest information density is found for the Alps and Scandinavia, where long and uninterrupted records are available"

"In close collaboration with the U.S. National Snow and Ice Data Center (NSIDC) and the Global Land Ice Measurements from Space (GLIMS) initiative, the WGMS is in charge of the Global Terrestrial Network for Glaciers (GTN-G) within GTOS/GCOS. GTN-G aims at combining (a) in-situ observations with remotely sensed data, (b) process understanding with global coverage and (c) traditional measurements with new technologies by using an integrated and multi-level strategy"
