= Goddard Institute for Space Studies =

New York City-based NASA laboratory

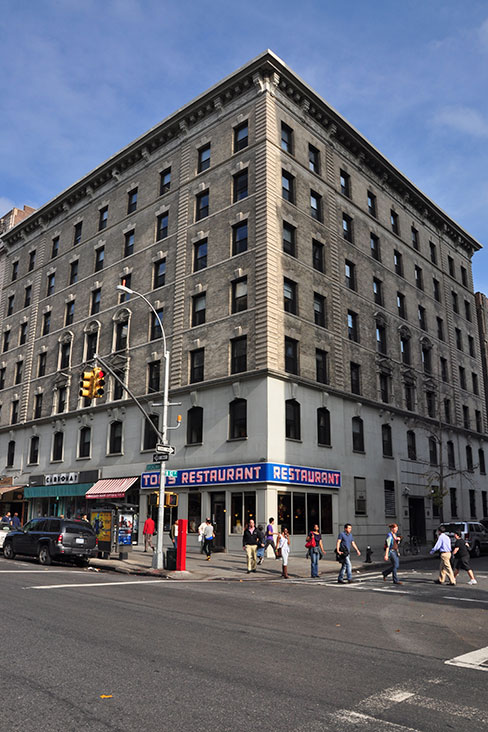
- Columbia University's Armstrong Hall, the building in which GISS was located.
- Founded: May 1961
- Founder: Robert Jastrow
- Purpose: Atmospheric and climate change
- Location: New York City, United States
- Coordinates: 40°48′20″N 73°57′55″W
- Affiliations: Columbia University, NASA
- Website: www.giss.nasa.gov

The Goddard Institute for Space Studies (GISS) is a laboratory in the Earth Sciences Division of NASA's Goddard Space Flight Center affiliated with the Columbia University Earth Institute. The institute is located at Columbia University in New York City. It was named after Robert H. Goddard, American engineer, professor, physicist and inventor who is credited with creating and building the world's first liquid-fueled rocket.

Research at the GISS emphasizes a broad study of global change, the natural and anthropogenic changes in our environment that affect the habitability of our planet. These effects may occur on greatly differing time scales, from one-time forcings such as volcanic explosions, to seasonal/annual effects such as El Niño, and on up to the millennia of ice ages.

The institute's research combines analysis of comprehensive global datasets (derived from surface stations combined with satellite data for sea surface temperatures) with global models of atmospheric, land surface, and oceanic processes. Study of past climate change on Earth and of other planetary atmospheres provides an additional tool in assessing general understanding of the atmosphere and its evolution.

GISS was established in May 1961 by Robert Jastrow to do basic research in space sciences in support of Goddard programs. Formally the institute was the New York City office of the GSFC Theoretical Division but was known as the Goddard Space Flight Center Institute for Space Studies or in some publications as simply the Institute for Space Studies. But even before it opened, the institute had been referred to in the press as the Goddard Institute for Space Studies. It was separated from the Theoretical Division in July 1962. Its offices were originally located in The Interchurch Center, and the institute moved into Columbia's Armstrong Hall (a renovated apartment building previously known as the Ostend apartments and subsequently the Oxford Residence Hotel) in April 1966.

From 1981 to 2013, GISS was directed by James E. Hansen. In June 2014, Gavin A. Schmidt was named the institute's third director.

On April 25, 2025, NASA announced that it was cancelling the lease on the Armstrong Hall as part of the Trump administration's review of federal leases. Since June 1, 2025, GISS personnel have been working remotely.

== History of scientific research ==
In the 1960s, GISS was a frequent center for high-level scientific workshops, including the "History of the Earth's Crust Symposium" in November 1966, which has been described as the meeting that gave birth to the idea of plate tectonics.

At a GISS workshop in 1967, John Wheeler popularized the term "black hole" as a shorthand for "gravitationally completely collapsed star," though the term was not coined there. Hong-Yee Chiu is credited with introducing the term "quasar" while working at GISS in 1964.

In September 1974, at a seminal meeting led by Patrick Thaddeus at GISS with John Mather (his then post-doc) and others discussions began on the possibility of building a satellite to measure both the spectrum and possible spatial fluctuations of the Cosmic Microwave Background. This led directly to the COBE satellite project and a Nobel Prize for Mather.

GISS personnel were involved as instrument and science team scientists in multiple historic NASA Solar System missions, Mariner 5 to Venus, Pioneer 10 and 11 to Jupiter and Saturn, the Voyager program, Pioneer Venus, Galileo to Jupiter, the unsuccessful Mars Observer and Climate Orbiter, and Cassini-Huygens mission to Saturn.

Polarimetry has been a speciality of GISS since the Pioneer, Voyager, and Galileo missions, and has been adapted to Earth observing missions as well. Notably, Michael Mishchenko of GISS was project scientist for the Glory mission, which failed to reach orbit after launch in 2011. Glory would have employed the Aerosol Polarimetry Sensor (APS) developed by GISS scientists had it reached orbit. More recently, Brian Cairns of GISS is one of the deputy project scientists of the PACE mission, which launched in February 2024 and has two polarimeters on board.

== Climate change research ==
A key objective of Goddard Institute for Space Studies research is prediction of climate change in the 21st century, which EPA and NOAA also focus on. The research combines paleogeological record, analysis of comprehensive global datasets (derived mainly from spacecraft observations), with global models of atmospheric, land surface, and oceanic processes.

Climate science predictions are based substantially on historical analysis of Earth's paleoclimate (climate through geological ages), and the sea-level/ temperature/ carbon dioxide record.

Changes in carbon dioxide associated with continental drift, and the decrease in volcanism as India arrived at the Asian continent, allowed temperatures to drop & Antarctic ice-sheets to form. This resulted in a 75m drop in sea level, allowing our present-day coastlines & habitats to form and stabilize.

Global change studies at GISS are coordinated with research at other groups within the Earth Sciences Division, including the Laboratory for Atmospheres, Laboratory for Hydrospheric and Biospheric Sciences, and Earth Observing System science office.

== Awards ==
GISS director James Hansen received the Heinz Award in 2001.

In November 2004, climatologists Drew Shindell and Gavin Schmidt were named amongst Scientific American magazine's Top 50 Scientist award.

One-time GISS post-doctoral scientist John C. Mather was years later awarded the Nobel Prize in Physics in 2006.

Climate impacts researcher Cynthia Rosenzweig was awarded the World Food Prize in 2022.

== Alumni ==
People who have worked at GISS and their periods of employment include:

- W. David Arnett, (1966-1967), postdoc
- Norman H. Baker (1962-1965)
- Harold E. Brooks (1982-1985), grad student
- Alastair G. W. Cameron (1961-1966)
- Mark Cane (1966-1970, 1975–1976), programmer, postdoc
- Jérôme Chappellaz (1990-1991)
- Hong-Yee Chiu (1961-1984)
- Benjamin Cook (2008-)
- Thomas M. Dame (1983-1984), postdoc
- Anthony Del Genio (1979-2019)
- Dilhan Eryurt (née Ezer) (1964-1966, 1969–1973), postdoc and staff scientist
- Rhodes Fairbridge (1955-2006)
- Inez Fung (1986-1993)
- Michael Ghil (1975-1976)
- Douglas Gough (1967-1969)
- Milton Halem (1961-1977)
- James Hansen (1967-2014)
- Christine P. Hendon (1998-2000), intern
- Robert Jastrow (1961-1981)
- John Knox (1995-2001), postdoc
- Joel S. Levine (1967-1969), grad student
- Ralph Linsker (1968-1972)
- Kuo-Nan Liou (1970-1972), postdoc
- Leon B. Lucy (1962), postdoc
- Kate Marvel (2015-2022, 2024-)
- John C. Mather (1974-1976), postdoc
- John McAfee (1968-1970), programmer
- Michael I. Mishchenko (1992-2020)
- Michael J. Prather (1985-1992)
- Matthew D. Pearce (2014-current), education program speciaist
- William J. Quirk (1974-1978), postdoc
- S. Ichtiaque Rasool (1961-1971)
- Cynthia Rosenzweig (1985-)
- William B. Rossow (1979-2007)
- Gavin Schmidt (1996-)
- Stephen Schneider (1971-1972), postdoc
- Stephen Self (1977-1979)
- Drew Shindell (1995-2014)
- Richard Somerville (1971-1974)
- Richard Stothers (1961-2011)
- Patrick Thaddeus (1966-1986)
- James W. Truran (1965-1967), postdoc
- Sachiko Tsuruta (c. 1964), graduate student
- Nadine Unger (2002-2010)
- C. V. Vishveshwara (c. 1969), postdoc

== In popular culture ==
- The institute was housed at the corner of West 112th St. and Broadway in New York City in Columbia University's Armstrong Hall (from April 1966 to May 2025). The building also houses Tom's Restaurant, which was the exterior for the restaurant in Seinfeld and the subject of the Suzanne Vega song Tom's Diner.
- WQED made a documentary in the 1960s "The Universe on a Scratch Pad" about the theoretical work being done at GISS.

== See also ==
- Earth Simulator
- EdGCM
- National Center for Atmospheric Research
- Robert Jastrow
- James Hansen
