= Climatic Change (journal) =

- Discipline: Climatology, environmental science
- Language: English
- Edited by: M. Oppenheimer, G. Yohe

Publication details
- History: 1977–present
- Publisher: Springer Science+Business Media
- Frequency: biweekly
- Impact factor: 4.743 (2020)

Standard abbreviations
- ISO 4: Clim. Change

Indexing
- CODEN: CLCHDX
- ISSN: 0165-0009 (print); 1573-1480 (web)
- LCCN: 77643914
- OCLC no.: 300183508

Links
- Journal homepage

Climatic Change is a biweekly peer-reviewed scientific journal published by Springer Science+Business Media covering cross-disciplinary work on all aspects of climate change and variability. It was established in 1977 by Stephen H. Schneider, and the current editors-in-chief are Michael Oppenheimer (Princeton University) and Gary Yohe (Wesleyan University).

== Abstracting and indexing ==
The journal is abstracted and indexed in:

- Science Citation Index
- Scopus
- Inspec
- Chemical Abstracts Service
- EBSCO databases
- ProQuest
- CAB International
- Academic OneFile
- AGRICOLA
- Biological Abstracts
- BIOSIS Previews
- CAB Abstracts
- Current Contents/Agriculture, Biology & Environmental Sciences
- Current Contents/Physical, Chemical and Earth Sciences
- EI-Compendex
- Elsevier Biobase
- Expanded Academic
- GeoArchive
- Geobase
- GeoRef
- INIS Atomindex
- International Bibliography of Book Reviews
- International Bibliography of Periodical Literature
- PASCAL
- Research Papers in Economics
