= Jacques Waben =

Dutch painter

- Born: 1590; Alkmaar
- Died: 1634 (aged 43–44); Hoorn
- Known for: Portrait painting history painting
- Movement: Dutch Golden Age

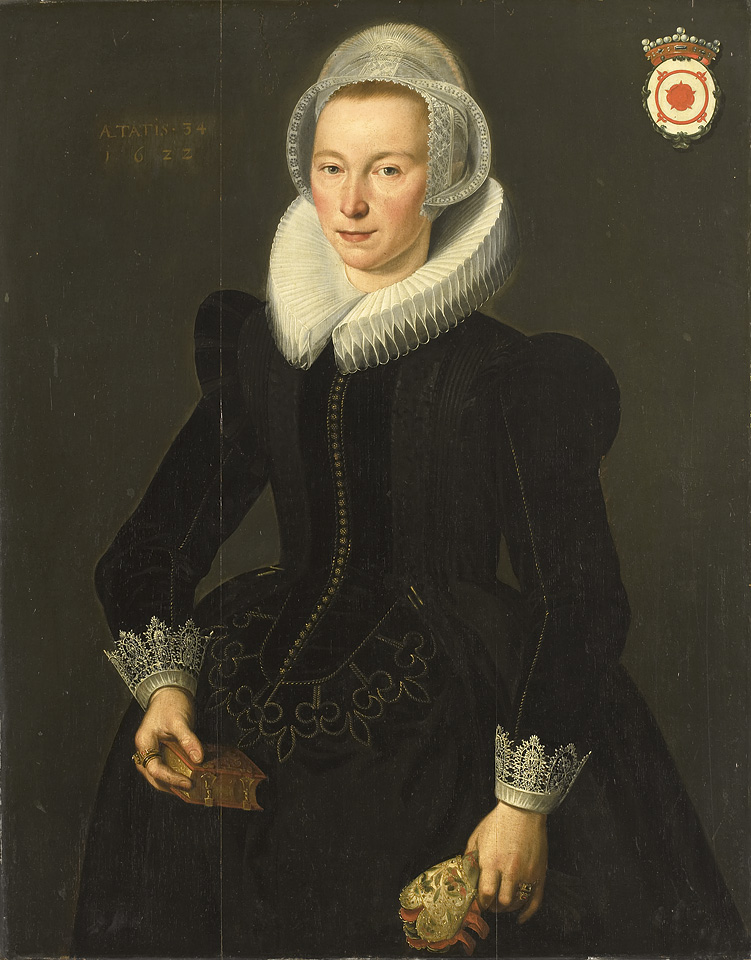
Grietje Adriaensdr Grootes (1588-1623), 1622

Jacques Waben (c. 1590, Alkmaar – c. 1634, Hoorn), was a Dutch Golden Age portrait painter.

== Biography ==
According to Houbraken he was a good portrait and history painter, who painted both small and large pieces. Houbraken admired the history of Joseph in 4 panels that hung in the Proveniers Hof in Hoorn when he was writing. He also saw a history of Jephthah dated 1602, at the Hoorn home of the painter Johannes Bronkhorst.

According to the RKD many of his paintings survive in local private collections and the Westfries Museum.
