= Risdam =

Neighborhood in Hoorn, Netherlands

- Neighborhood
- Location in the Netherlands
- Coordinates: 52°39′41″N 5°3′9″E
- Country: Netherlands
- Province: North Holland
- Municipality: Hoorn

Area
  - Total: 4.66 km^{2} (1.80 sq mi)

Population (2019)
  - Total: 17,645
  - Density: 3,790/km^{2} (9,810/sq mi)
- Postal code: 1625, 1689

Risdam (Dutch pronunciation: [ˈrɪzdɑm]) is a neighborhood in the northwest of Hoorn, Netherlands. The name was derived from Rijsdam, a dam in the historic waterway that ran along the Keern. Today, the neighborhood is split into the districts Risdam-Noord, Risdam-Zuid and Nieuwe Steen. Risdam-Noord formally belongs to the village of Zwaag.

Risdam had a total population of 17,645 in 2019. In the southwestern part of the neighborhood, there is a sports and leisure center with an ice skating rink, a movie theater, a hotel, a casino and a running track. The city hall of Hoorn is located in the southeast of the neighborhood.

Risdam is split into the districts Risdam-Noord (10), Risdam-Zuid (5) and Nieuwe Steen (6).
