= Jewish cemetery, Hoorn =

Dutch cemetery

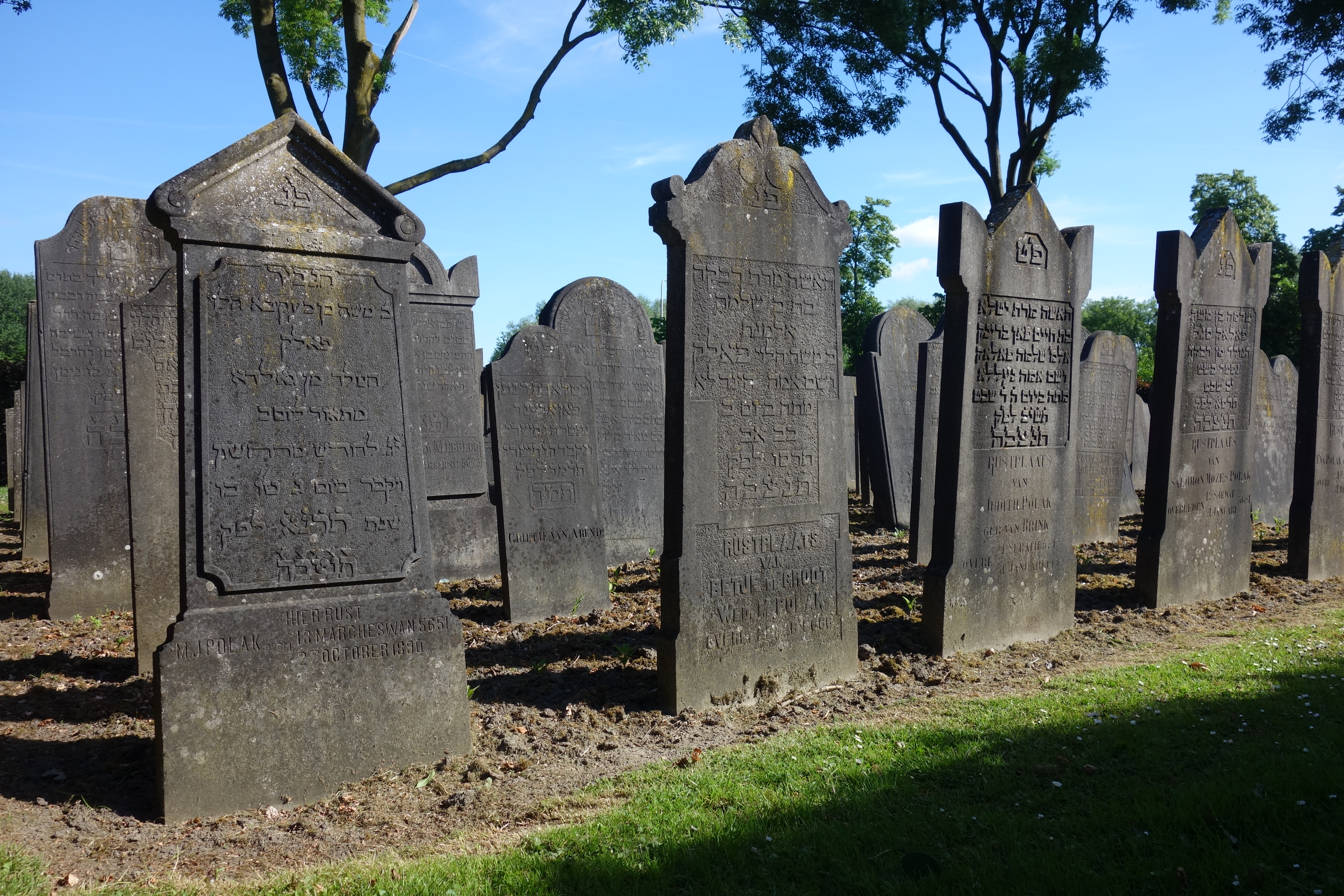

Details
- Established: 1968
- Location: Berkhouterweg, Hoorn
- Coordinates: 52°38′49″N 5°02′16″E
- Owned by: NIK
- No. of graves: 228

The Jewish cemetery in Hoorn can refer to the original Jewish cemetery on the outskirts of the Dutch city of Hoorn (where the first burial took place in 1762), or to a separate section of today's public cemetery. That Jewish section was opened in 1968, after the old Jewish cemetery was cleared for road construction.

The history of the cemetery reflects that of the Jewish community in Hoorn, which started in the Dutch Golden Age, prospered in the 18th and 19th centuries, and declined in the 20th century, when the cemetery suffered from lack of maintenance. The Nazis ended what was left, and organizationally, the Jewish community of Hoorn merged with that of Enkhuizen. The current public cemetery of Hoorn commemorates the original cemetery, and has 219 gravestones from the original cemetery, and the remains of over 600 people.

== History ==
=== Establishment and growth ===
Number of Jews in and around Hoorn
Year	
1809	267/260
1840	468
1849	450
1869	433
1899	208
1930	57

A street now named "Jeudje" was formerly called (versions of) "Jodenstraat", or "street of the Jews" and was referenced in a 1604 chronicle by Theodorus Velius, who mentions it for the year 1554, perhaps reflecting his current situation: a group of Jews in Hoorn in 1550 would have been very unlikely, but Jews may have lived in Hoorn in 1604. Scandal erupted in 1614 when three Mennonites in Hoorn were put on trial for apostasy after having converted to Judaism. A "resolution" from the Register of Holland and West-Friesland (1613–1619) makes mentions of Jews who were imprisoned in Hoorn, mandating that they be "put to order"; historians David Kromhout and Adri Offenberg claim such measures were likely prompted by "scandals, offences and seductions" ascribed to Jews allegedly converting Christians.

Hoorn historian Henk Saaltink points out that Mennonites were also persecuted, and that among converted Mennonites the name "Ger" is common--from the Hebrew term Ger toshav, for a non-Jew who has converted or lives in accordance with Jewish customs. In a 1631 document from the city government, mention is made of Sephardic Jews, Portuguese Jews (who had fled Spain after the Reconquista), mostly merchants, who settled in Hoorn. Also mentioned are "high German" or Ashkenazi Jews.

Drawn by the town's economic growth, many of the Sephardic Jews traded in dried fruits and nuts (Mediterranean products), but were given only limited rights—they were not allowed to open stores, for instance, and city documents from 1631 and after confirm the ban on retail. International trade from Hoorn declined after 1650 and so do the archives about a Jewish presence: it is likely that Jewish merchants in Hoorn took off for the still-bustling city of Amsterdam (the number of Jewish marriages in the city declines as well), and it is also possible that the remaining Jews deviated in their liturgy from common practice. Rabbi Rüben Selig Süssman may have put an end to such practices in the second half of the 18th century.

A revival of Jewish life came in the 18th century, with an influx of Ashkenazi Jews to the Netherlands, and to Hoorn. Those immigrants were often destitute, having fallen victim to antisemitic persecution, and were welcomed less warmly than the Sephardic Jews. In 1780, a synagogue was built, on the Italiaanse Zeedijk (near the Visserseiland and Oostereiland, in the harbor). A ritual bath for women was established in 1786, and there are bakers who followed Jewish dietary laws; Saaltink sees the influence of Rabbi Süssman throughout these developments.

The Jewish community thrived in the first half of the 19th century; between 1809 and 1849, the Jewish community grew from 250 to 460, and was the ninth largest in the country, with much of the growth in Hoorn and other small towns coming from Amsterdam Jews. After 1850, economic circumstances take their toll in Hoorn also, and Jews start leaving the city. Still, they opened a new school and in 1874, the synagogue was renovated and expanded the next decade. The community had an active social life and several clubs and organizations, and a number of Jewish citizens participated in city and local government. It diminished in size and importance at the end of the 19th century.

Enkhuizen had a Jewish cemetery by 1738 already; the Jewish community in Hoorn filed an official request based on the equal treatment of religions in 1778. The cemetery in Hoorn was inaugurated that year, though the earliest burial took place in 1762, judging from a still legible gravestone. It was located on 't Weeltje, a path on the western side of town that led to meadows, a windmill, and a wiel called the Grote Waal. It was surrounded by a wall and had a bet tohorah for the ritual cleansing of the body. In 1839 an adjacent home was torn down and the land was added to the cemetery. A further extension (and renovation of the bet tohorah) took place in 1917–1918.

=== Decline ===
By the 1920s, it was clear that the Jewish community in Hoorn was growing smaller, and not enough adult men could be found to have services. When the 150th anniversary of the synagogue was celebrated, in 1930, this decrease was noted also, and before 1940, the cemetery was already suffering from a lack of maintenance. When World War II broke out, the Nazi occupiers deported almost all of the city's Jews to Westerbork; in April 1942 whoever remained (a few managed to escape) was forcibly moved to Amsterdam, and then deported elsewhere. The synagogue was sold to a member of the Dutch Nazi party; what happened to its furniture and liturgical objects is unknown. A community could not be sustained after the war's end, and in 1948, the Jewish community in Hoorn merged with that of Enkhuizen. Discussions with the municipality did not lead to municipal funding for the neglected cemetery. In 1953, the building that had housed the synagogue was sold to the city, and then torn down. The bet tohorah was apparently rented out as a garage, though the owner was to clear the house for funerals and to prevent children from playing in the cemetery.

== Recent history ==
When the Grote Waal became the site of a large housing development in the 1950s, it was deemed necessary to clear the Jewish cemetery in order to build an access road to the new neighborhood. The remains of 614 people were moved to the public cemetery on the Berkhouterweg. The city put up a monument in 1979 to remember its murdered Jewish citizens. On the location of the former synagogue, Italiaanse Zeedijk 122, a commemorative plaque was placed on the gable of the newly constructed building. A plaque to remember those who protected Jewish people during World War II was placed on a bridge by the Jeudje, in 2006.

In 2015, a plaque was placed on the Westersingel, commemorating the original location of the cemetery (which was roughly at the intersection of the current streets De Weel and De Keern). A commemorative stone found accidentally in 2020 remembered the extension in 1918. That stone, with two others that had been preserved in the garden of Hoorn's Westfries Museum, were placed in the cemetery in the presence of local politicians and Dutch chief rabbi Binyomin Jacobs, along with a new stone outlining the history of the cemetery. These three stones came from the bot tohorah, and the process to reclaim them was put in motion by Heiman Maurits Polak, whose family had been buried in the cemetery at least since 1842. Two came from the building's gable (one honoring the 1918 renovation, with the name of Baruch van Kleef, the parnas of Hoorn, the other with a quote from Isaiah 25) and had been kept at the Westfries Museum; the other was a commemorative plaque with a list of names including that of Polak's father.

=== Description ===
Around 2009, the city of Hoorn reported on the origin and current situation of the cemetery, as follows. The cemetery was installed in the northeast corner of the public cemetery. Permission for the removal of the remains and the headstones from the old cemetery was granted by chief rabbi Elieser Berling of Utrecht (1960–1985), on the condition that all Jewish customs and his own instructions were followed. In 1967–1968, around 219 gravestones and the remains of 614 people (gathered individually into bags) were collected and moved; the new cemetery, including the Jewish section, was opened on 20 March 1969. The section is rectangular, measures 20 m (66 ft) by 30 m (98 ft), and is surrounded by a man-sized hedge. The gravestones are lined up in nine rows, with the two (recumbent) slabs in the first row. There is also a collective grave, marked by a small headstone. The one slab is for rabbi Rüben Selig Süssman (d. 1796), his high rank probably explaining the unusual grave; the other dates from 1980. The stones are mostly executed in a simple fashion, with mostly traditional but also some contemporary stylistic elements, and some with symbols (an opened Torah flanked by circumcision tools). 163 are inscribed only in Hebrew; 63 in Hebrew and Dutch; and six in Dutch only. The report concludes with an appreciation of the cemetery's importance:

De joodse begraafplaats aan de Berkhouterweg met bijbehorende grafstenen is van algemeen belang vanwege de grote cultuurhistorische waarde van de aanwezige 18de-, 19de- en 20-eeuwse grafstenen die samen een laatste tastbare herinnering vormen aan de nagenoeg verdwenen joodse gemeenschap in Hoorn in het algemeen en aan individuele leden van deze gemeenschap, waaronder de vooraanstaande rabbijn Süssman.

The Jewish cemetery on the Berkhouterweg with the gravestones is of general interest because of the great cultural-historical value of the present 18th, 19th, and 20th-century gravestones that together form the last tangible memory of the almost fully disappeared Jewish community as a whole, and of individual members of that community, including the prominent rabbi Süssman.

== Gallery ==
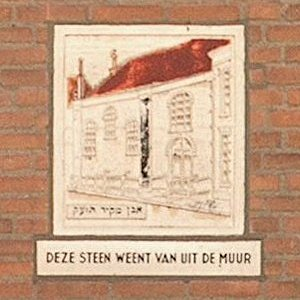
Commemorative plaque for the synagogue

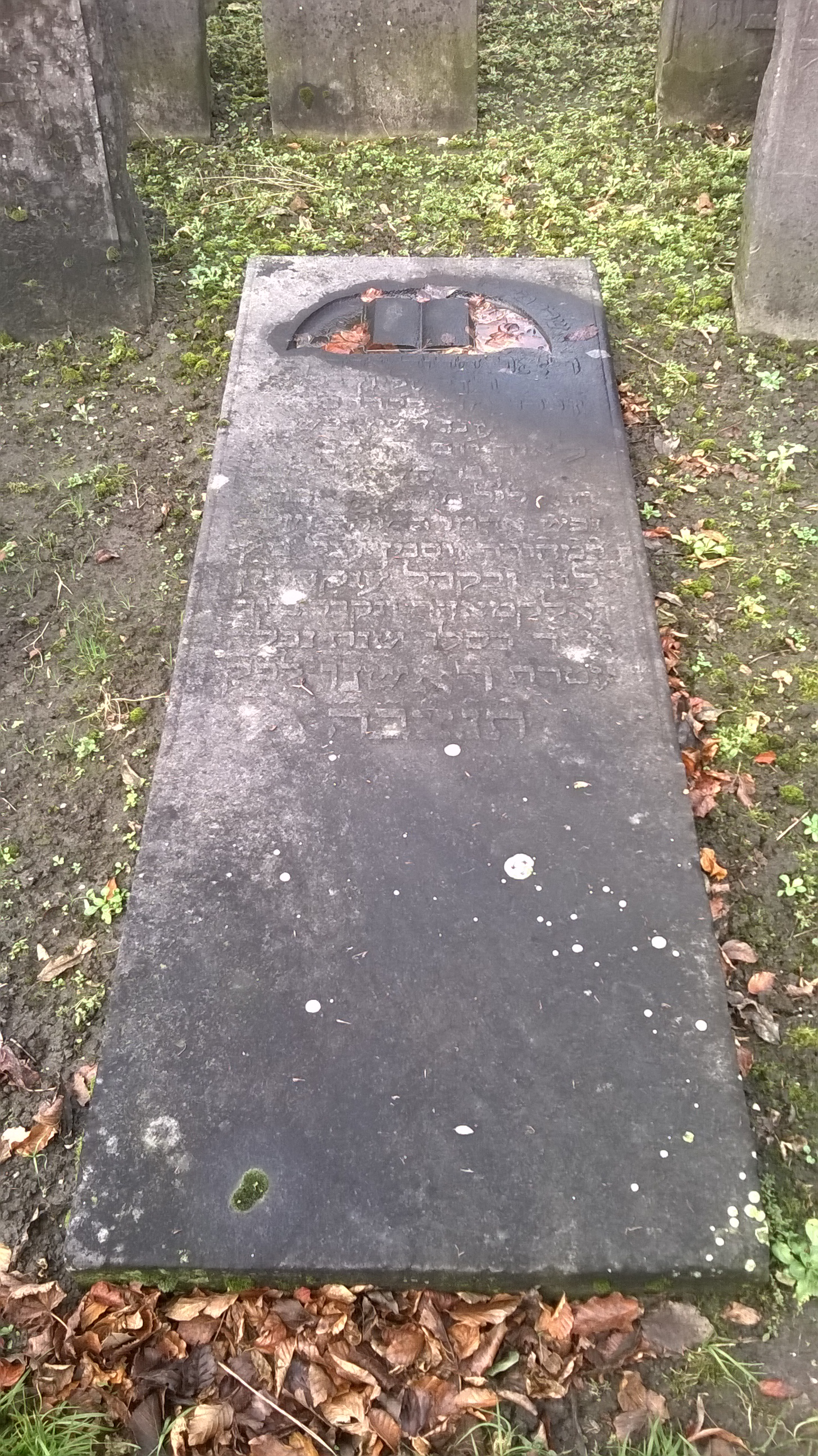
One of only two slabs in the cemetery, for rabbi Rüben Selig Süssman

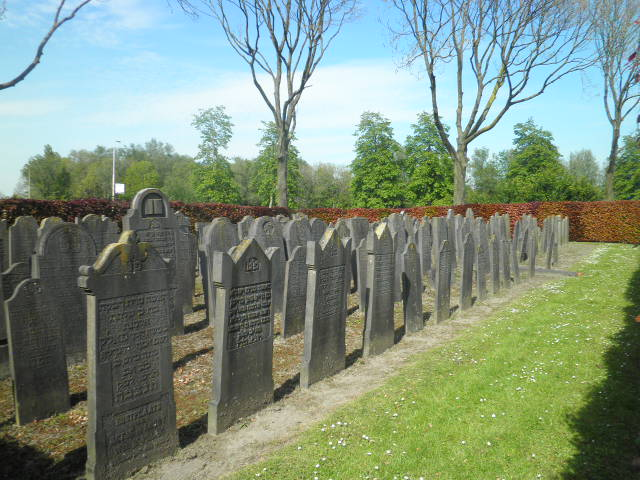
Rows of headstones
