= Roode Steen =

Square in Hoorn, Netherlands

Coordinates: 52°38′22″N 5°3′33″E

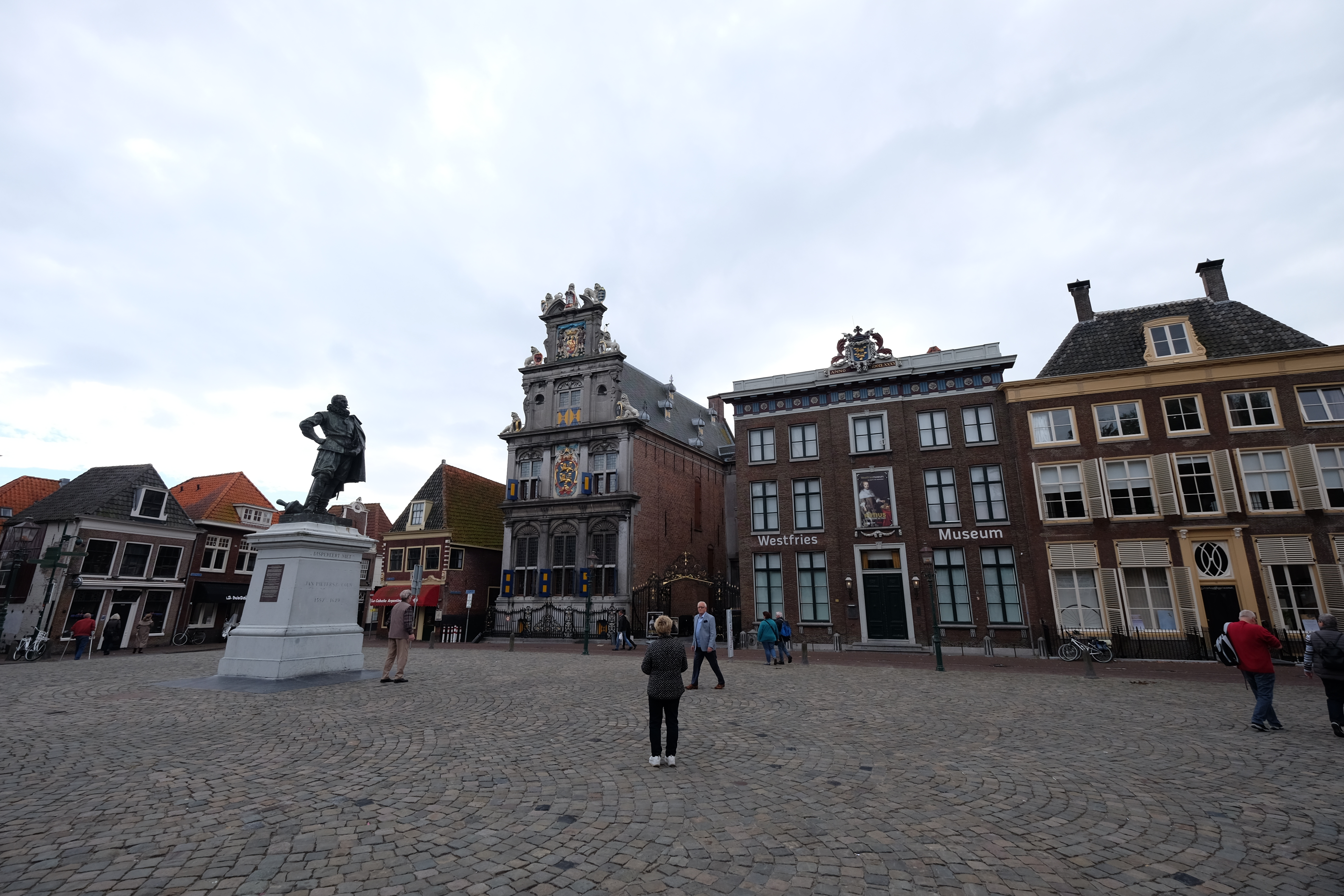
Roode Steen (west)

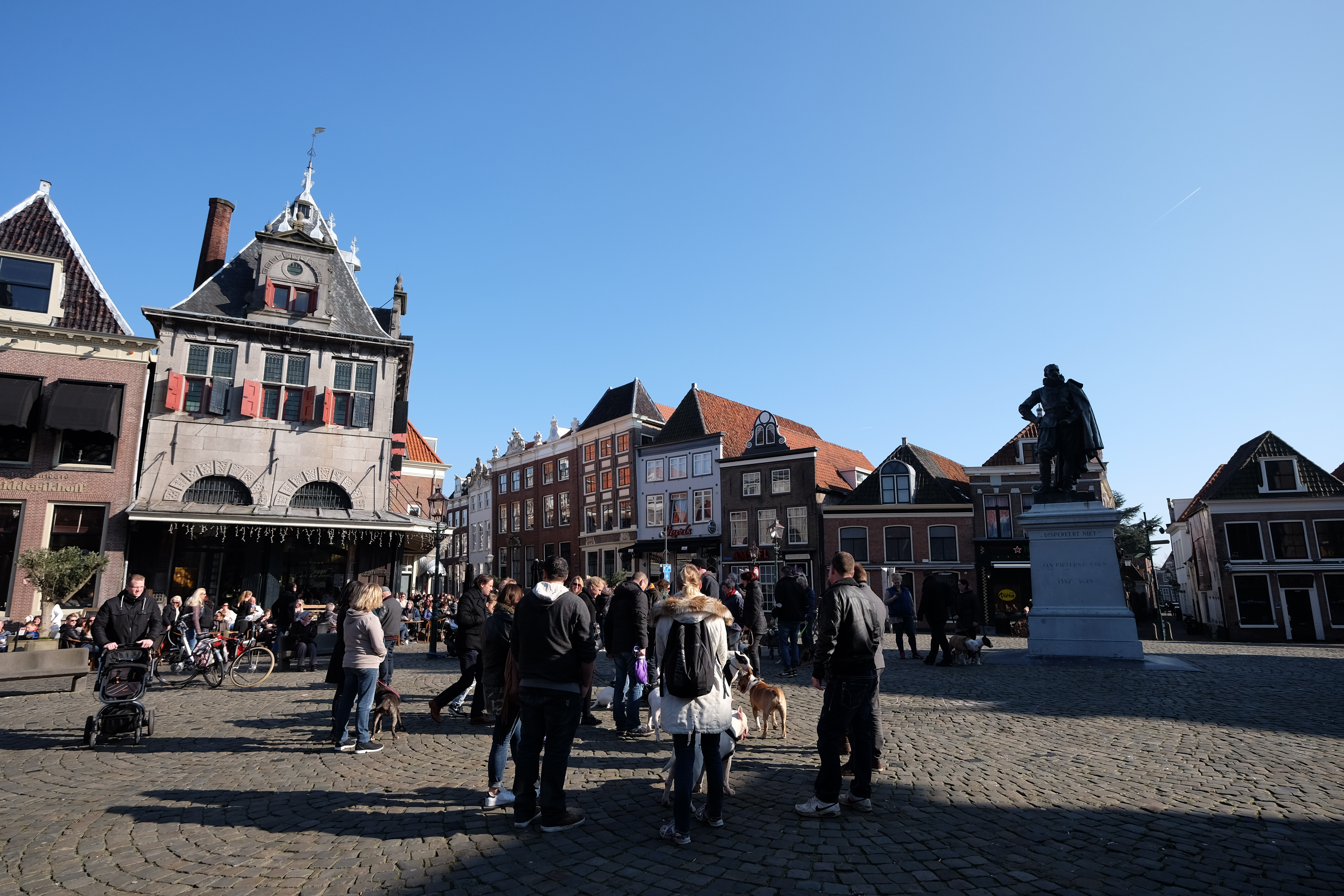
Roode Steen (southeast)

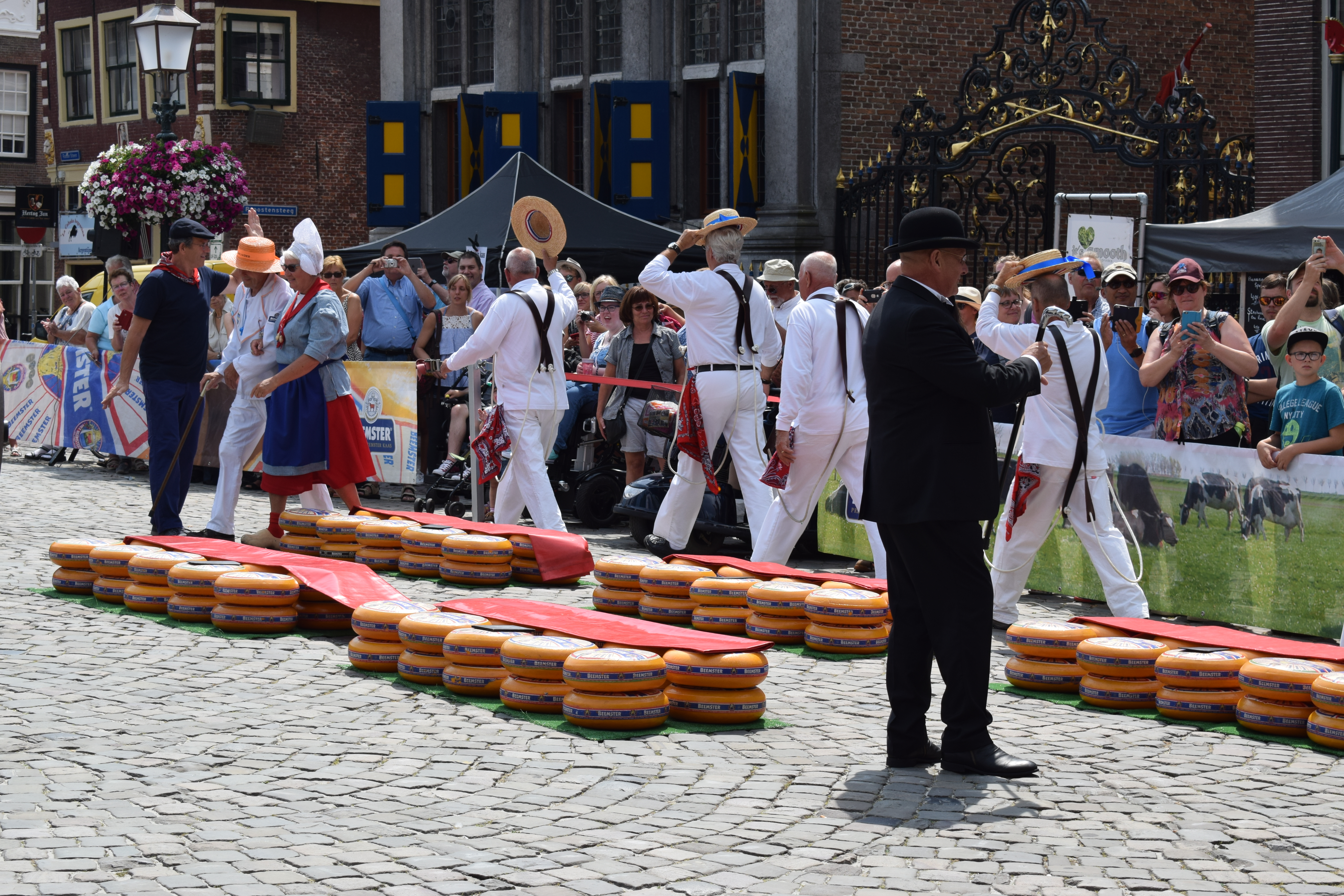
Traditional Dutch cheese market on Roode Steen

Roode Steen (Dutch pronunciation: [ˈroːdə steːn]; lit. 'Red Stone'), also known as Kaasmarkt (Dutch pronunciation: [ˈkaːsmɑr(ə)kt]; lit. 'Cheese Market'), is a square and a road junction in the city center of Hoorn, Netherlands.

The Westfries Museum and the weigh house (Waag) are both located on the Roode Steen. A statue of Jan Pieterszoon Coen, made by Ferdinand Leenhoff, was placed on the square in 1893.

== Road junction ==
Roode Steen is the meeting point of four streets and two alleys. Clockwise from the northwest, these are:

- Grote Noord
- Kerkstraat
- Grote Oost
- Grote Havensteeg
- West
- Proostensteeg

== See also ==
- Nieuwmarkt
