= Hoorn =

City and municipality in North Holland

- City and municipality
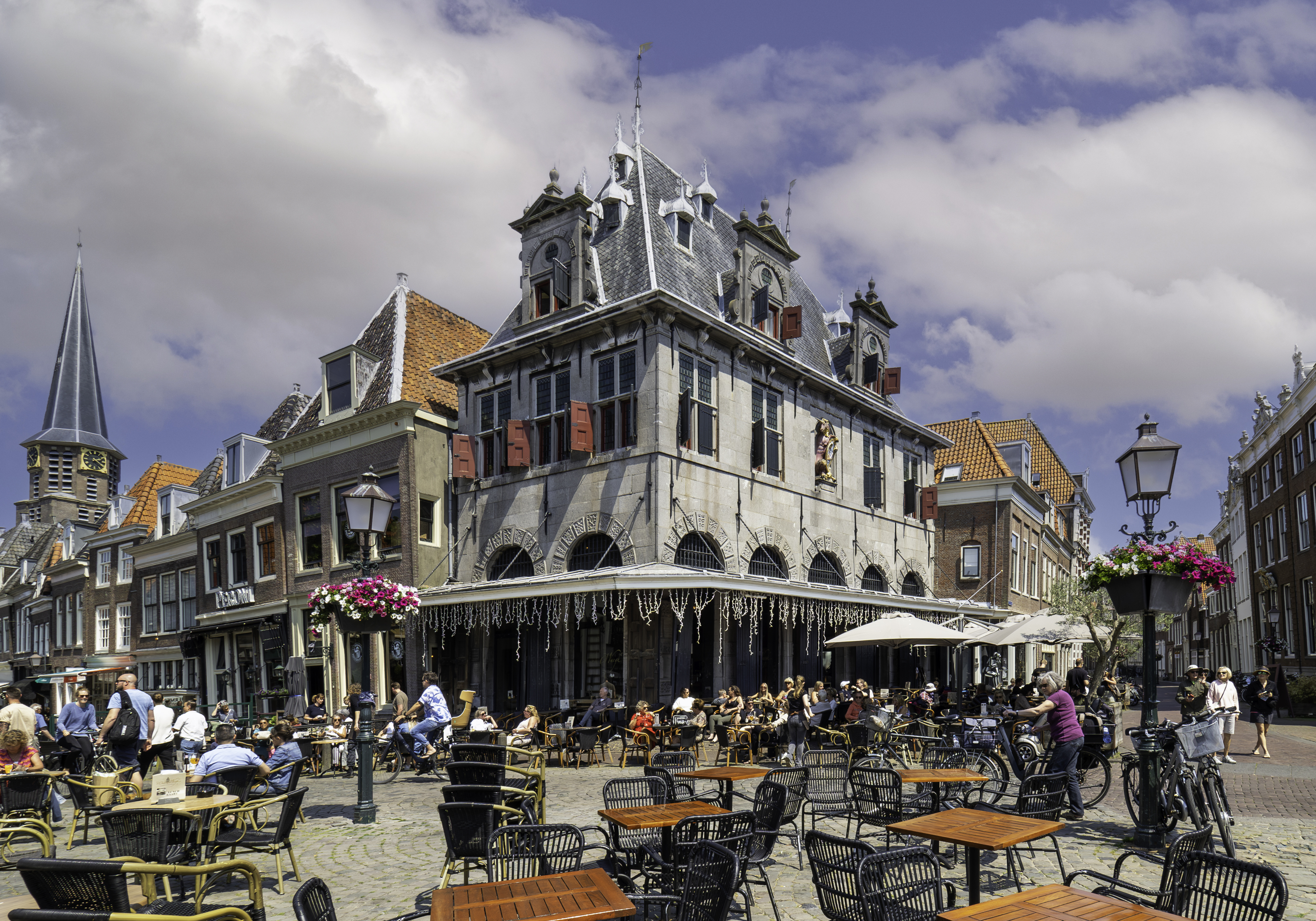
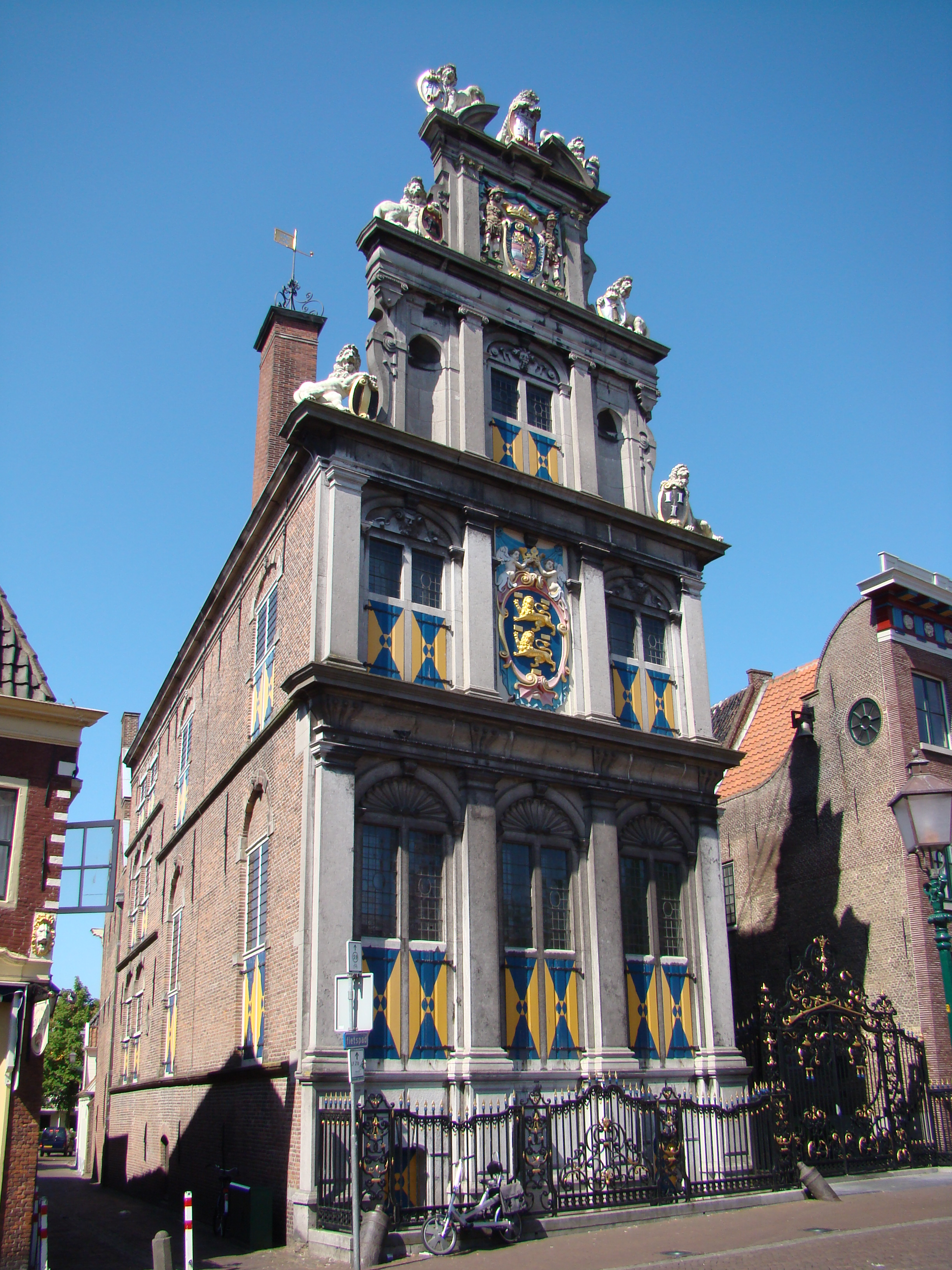
- Hoofdtoren and Houten Hoofd Waag Statencollege

- Flag Coat of arms

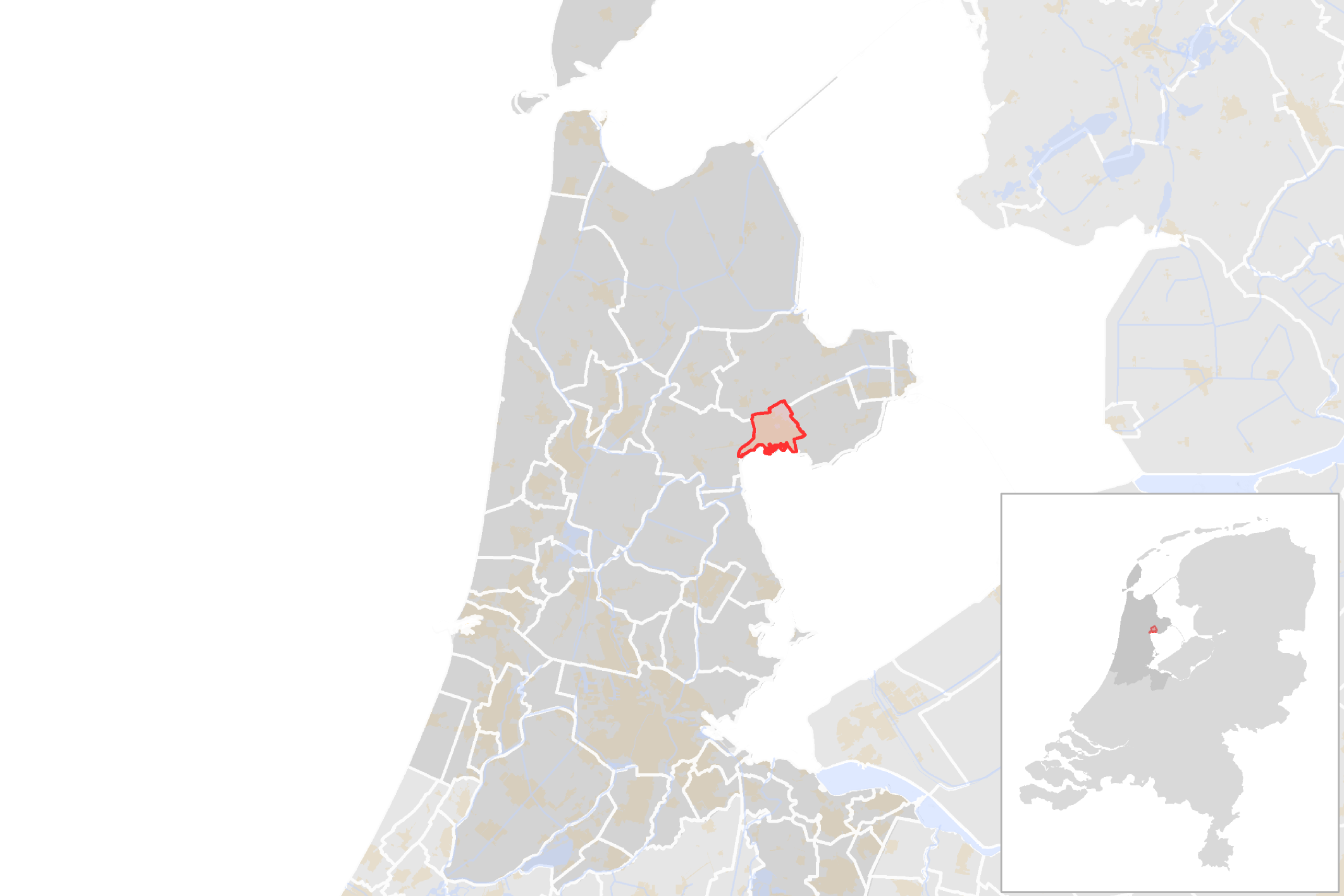
- Location within North Holland, Netherlands

- Location within the Netherlands Location within Europe
- Coordinates: 52°39′N 5°4′E
- Country: Netherlands
- Province: North Holland
- Subregion: West Friesland
- City rights: 1357 (669 years ago)

Government
  - Body: Municipal council
  - Mayor: Jan Nieuwenburg (Pro)

Area
  - Total: 53.46 km^{2} (20.64 sq mi)
  - Land: 20.38 km^{2} (7.87 sq mi)
  - Water: 33.08 km^{2} (12.77 sq mi)
- Elevation: −1 m (−3.3 ft)

Population (1 January 2026)
  - Total: 76,202
  - Density: 3,739/km^{2} (9,684/sq mi)
- Demonyms: Hoornaar; Hoornse (fem.); Horinees (colloq.)
- Time zone: UTC+1 (CET)
  - Summer (DST): UTC+2 (CEST)
- Postal codes: 1620–1628, 1689, 1695
- Area code: 0229
- Website: www.hoorn.nl

Hoorn (Dutch pronunciation: [ˈɦoːr(ə)n]) is a city and municipality in the northwest of the Netherlands, in the province of North Holland. It is the largest town and the traditional capital of the West Friesland region. Hoorn is located on the Markermeer, 20 kilometers (12 mi) east of Alkmaar and 35 kilometers (22 mi) north of Amsterdam. The municipality has just over 76,000 inhabitants and a land area of 20.38 km^{2} (7.87 sq mi), making it the third most densely populated municipality in North Holland after Haarlem and Amsterdam. Apart from the city of Hoorn, the municipality includes the villages of Blokker and Zwaag, as well as parts of the hamlets De Bangert, De Hulk and Munnickaij.

Granted city rights in 1357, Hoorn flourished during the Dutch Golden Age as a maritime hub, housing one of the six chambers of the Dutch East India Company (VOC). By the late eighteenth century, intensifying competition from nearby Amsterdam prompted Hoorn's transition from a prominent seaport into a regional center of trade, mainly serving the smaller villages of West Friesland. Today, Hoorn is sometimes regarded as part of the Randstad conurbation. Notably, Cape Horn and the Hoorn Islands were named in its honor.

== Etymology ==
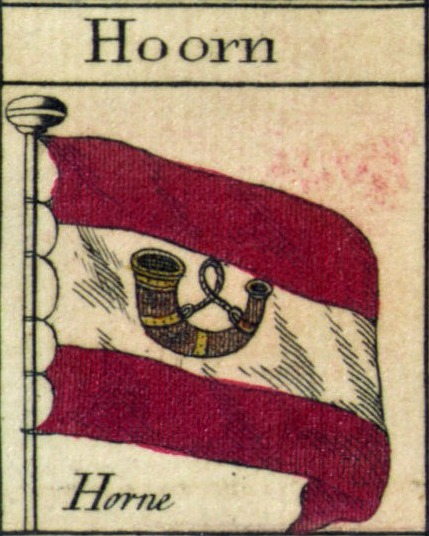
Variant flag of Hoorn (1783), with the obsolete French spelling Horne

The origin of the name Hoorn – in archaic spelling Hoern, Horne or Hoirn(e) – is uncertain. According to old Frisian legends, the name comes from Hornus, a bastard son of King Redbad and brother of Aldgillis II, who presumably founded the city in 719 and named it after himself. A different theory claims that the name was derived from a sign depicting a post horn, which hung from one of the taverns established by brewers from Hamburg in the early fourteenth century.

According to Hadrianus Junius, the name could also be a reference to the city's horn-shaped port. Others believed that the name was derived from damphoorn, a weed with a hollow stem that grew in the area at the time of the city's establishment. The chronicler Theodorus Velius rejects this theory, as well as the assertion that the name comes from "Dampterhorn", which was thought to be the only remaining neighborhood of the flooded village of Dampten.

One of the earliest mentions of Hoorn is found in a letter which states that, in 1303, a merchant from Bruges was imprisoned in West Friesland near a place called "Hornicwed". This phrase – although it is uncertain whether it actually refers to Hoorn – is a compound of the Middle Dutch words hornic, meaning "corner", and wed, meaning "shallow water". It is likely that the name Hoorn was indeed derived from Middle Dutch hornic, or simply horn, and that the city was named for its location in a sharp bight of (the former) Lake Flevo.

As a descendant of the reconstructed Proto-Germanic *hurnijǭ, the name Hoorn is a cognate with Danish and Norwegian hjørne, Icelandic horn, Swedish hörn(a), and West Frisian herne, which have all preserved the meaning of "corner". In Modern Dutch, however, the word hoorn translates to "horn", both in an acoustic and anatomical sense.

== History ==
Historical population
Year	Pop.	±% p.a.
1398	3,800	—
1514	5,400	+0.30%
1550	8,000	+1.10%
1622	14,139	+0.79%
1632	13,500	−0.46%
1732	12,000	−0.12%
1795	9,551	−0.36%
Source: Lourens & Lucassen 1997, pp. 62–63

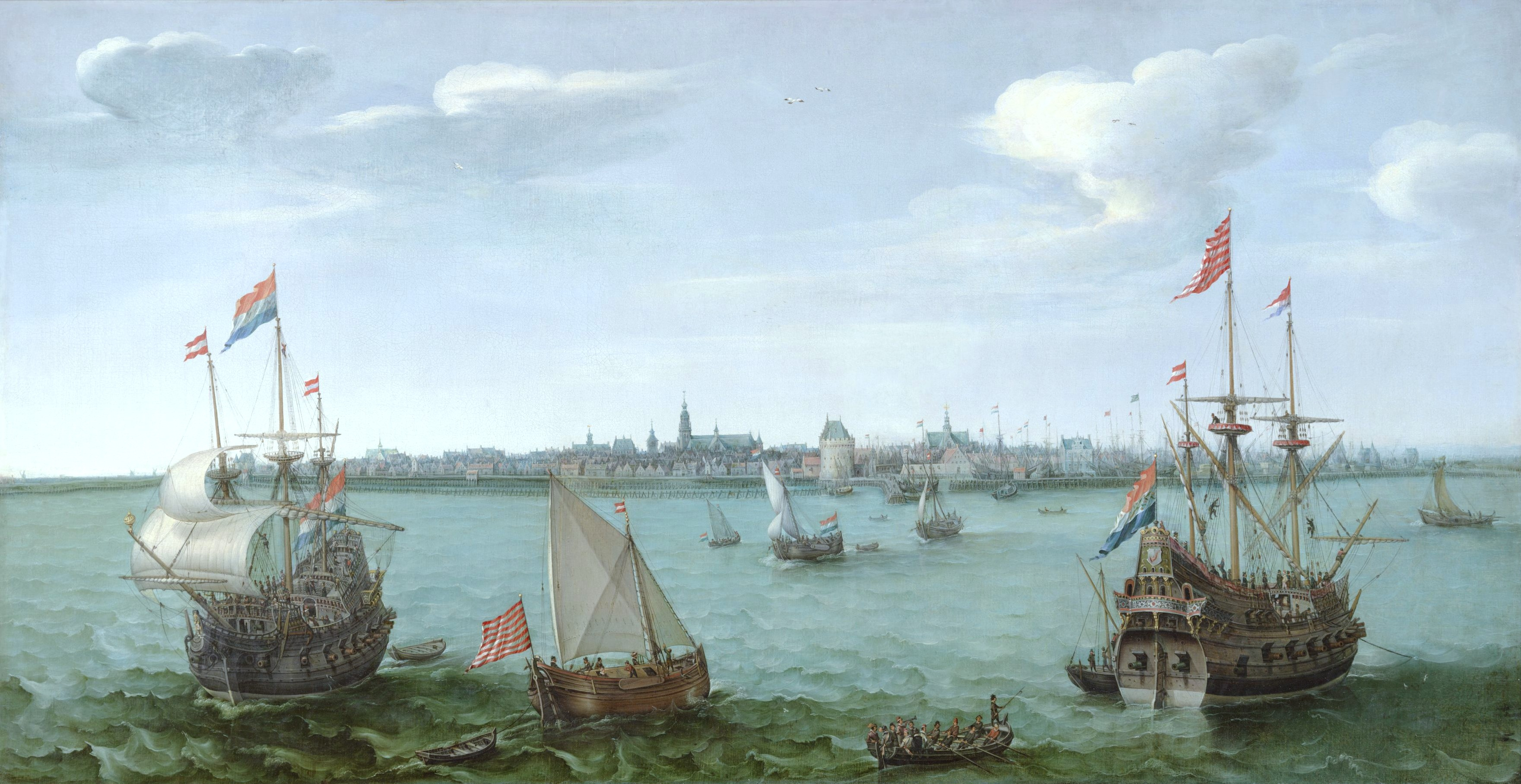
Gezicht op Hoorn (1622) by Hendrick Cornelisz Vroom

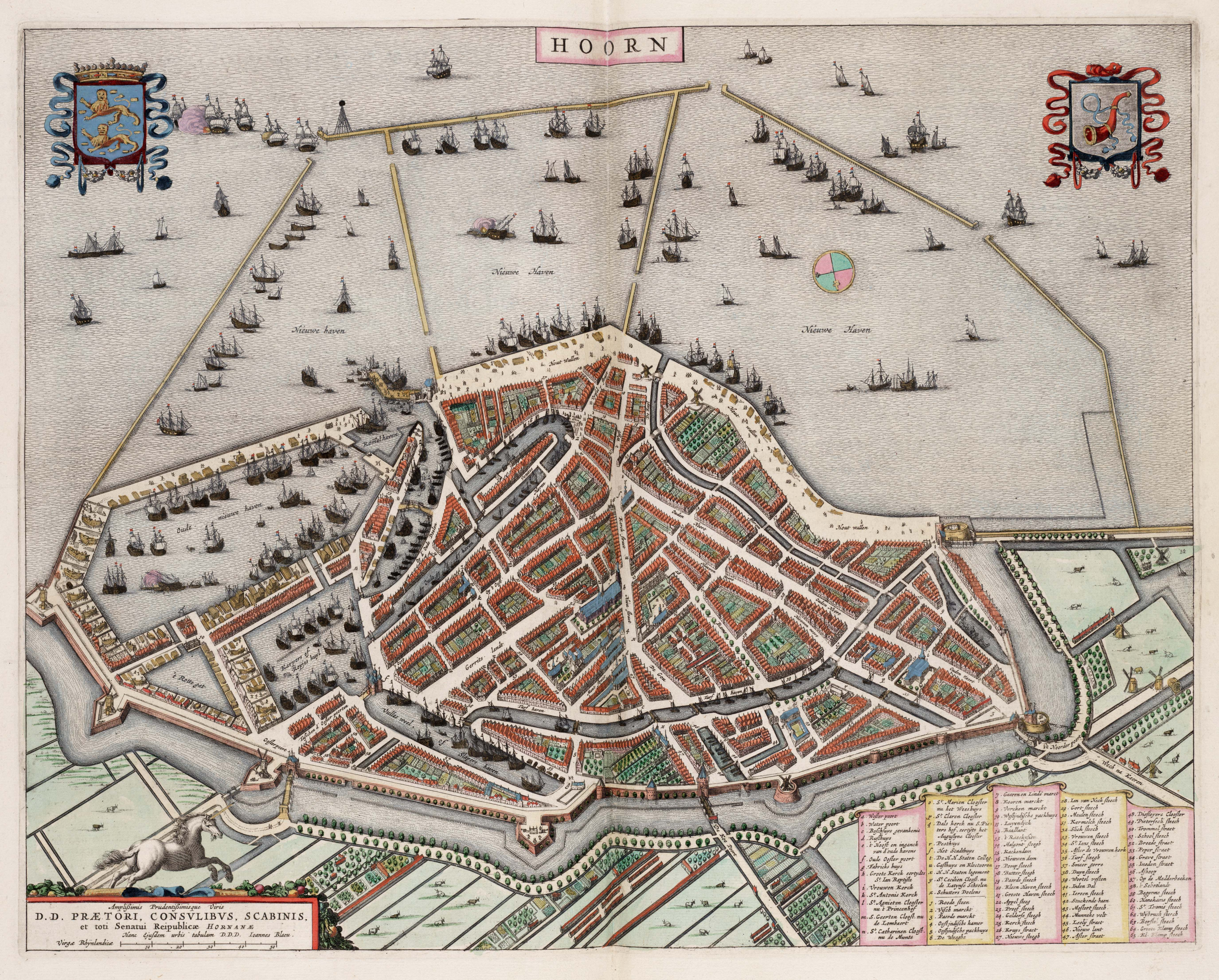
Map of Hoorn (1649) by Joan Blaeu

=== Early history ===
In the beginning of the eighth century, the threat of Viking raids led to unrest in the Frisian Kingdom, causing many people to leave their hometowns and settle elsewhere. Following this example, Hornus – a bastard son of Redbad – allegedly moved westward along with his companions and, in 719, built a settlement west of the river Vlie, which he named after himself. This legendary settlement did not exist for long, as it burnt down only a few years later.

In the Late Middle Ages, the site of present-day Hoorn was a swampy area that was not at all suitable for agriculture, as opposed to the more fertile inland. Here, high production of dairy products led to the establishment of a marketplace within the domain of Zwaag, where the surpluse could be traded for other goods. This marketplace was located near a sluice in the river Gouw, which was the most convenient passage into the Zuiderzee for the surrounding villages.

The marketplace attracted many foreign traders, most notably from Hamburg and Bremen, who came to sell their goods (mostly beer) to the local population in return for butter and cheese. This also brought three brothers from Hamburg to the area, who recognized its convenient location and decided to each build an inn near the marketplace to increase the sale of their beers. The construction of these buildings was completed in 1316 and led to the expansion of the settlement, as more merchants from Northern Germany and Denmark now visited the place to trade. As a result, the settlement quickly developed into a village, which was then given the name of Hoorn. The town officially became a city in 1357, when Hoorn was awarded city rights by William V, Count of Holland, after a lump sum payment of 1,550 schilden. (Note: The exact date on which Hoorn received its city rights is debatable. The original certificate states that the city rights were granted in "1356, on the Sunday after Our Lady's Day", which corresponds to 26 March 1357 on the Gregorian calendar. However, the same certificate also states that the city rights were granted by William, "Verbeider of Hainaut". As his title changed to Count of Hainaut when his mother, the Countess of Hainaut, died on 23 June 1356, it has been argued that Hoorn must have received its city rights one year earlier, on 26 March 1356. Nonetheless, the city of Hoorn celebrated its 600 and 650 year anniversary in 1957 and 2007 respectively.)

=== Dutch Golden Age ===
Hoorn rapidly grew to become a major port city and a prosperous center of trade, which flourished during the sixteenth and seventeenth centuries – also known as the Dutch Golden Age. It was the seat of the Committed Councils of West Friesland and the Noorderkwartier (Dutch: Gecommitteerde Raden) from 1573 to 1795, and the seat of the Admiralty of the Noorderkwartier from 1589 to 1795, together with Enkhuizen. The city was also an important home base for the Dutch East India Company (VOC), the Dutch West India Company (WIC) and the Noordsche Compagnie.

Local merchants and seafarers established the city's trade network globally. In 1616, explorer Willem Schouten, together with Jacob Le Maire, navigated around the southernmost tip of South America, naming it Kaap Hoorn (Cape Horn) after his hometown. In 1619, Hoorn native Jan Pieterszoon Coen (1587–1629) founded the capital of the Dutch East Indies, initially proposing the name New Hoorn before it was named Batavia (present-day Jakarta). Coen became a controversial figure due to his violent military raids in Southeast Asia, particularly on the Banda Islands. Because of his prominence, Hoorn earned the nickname Coenstad ("Coen City"), and a statue of Coen was erected on the central square, Roode Steen, in 1893. The monument has drawn criticism in recent years, sparking ongoing public debate over Coen's colonial legacy.

=== Eighteenth century to present ===
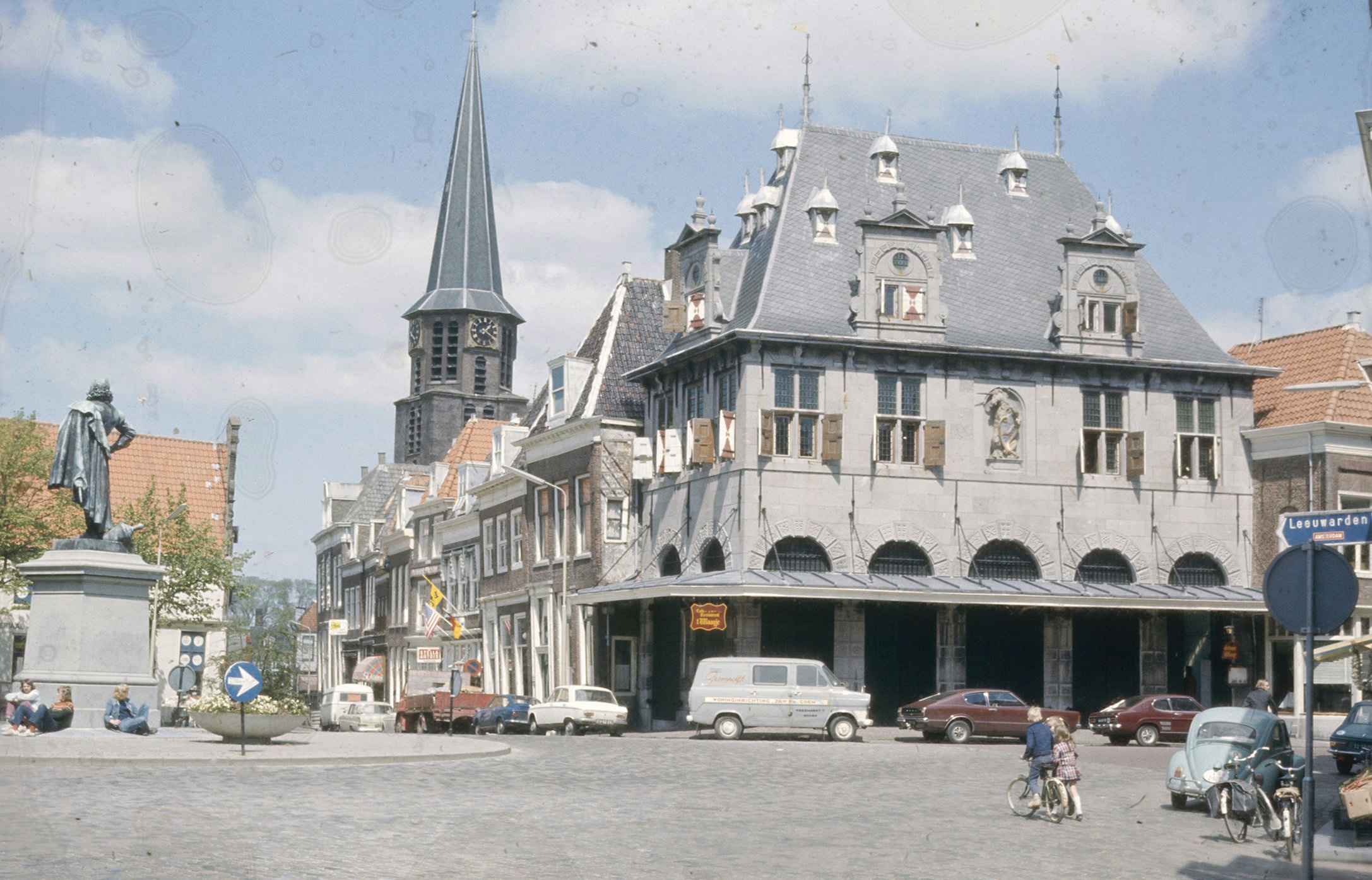
Roode Steen in 1975

Hoorn's fortunes declined somewhat in the eighteenth century. The prosperous trading port became little more than a sleepy fishing village on the Zuiderzee. Following Napoleonic occupation, there was a period during which the town gradually turned its back on the sea. It developed to become a regional center of trade, mainly serving the smaller villages of West Friesland. Stallholders and shopkeepers devoted themselves to the sale of dairy products and seeds. After the introduction of railways and metalled roads in the late nineteenth century, Hoorn rapidly became a conveniently located and easily accessible hub in the network of towns and villages of North Holland. In 1932, the Afsluitdijk was completed, and Hoorn was no longer a seaport.

The years after World War II saw a period of renewed growth. At the center of a flourishing horticultural region, the city developed a highly varied and dynamic economy. In the 1970s, Hoorn was designated as a residential growth zone (groeikern) by the Dutch government to relieve pressure on the overcrowded Randstad region. The construction of new residential districts drove rapid expansion, causing the city's population to rise from 18,500 in 1970 to 50,000 in 1984.

== Geography ==
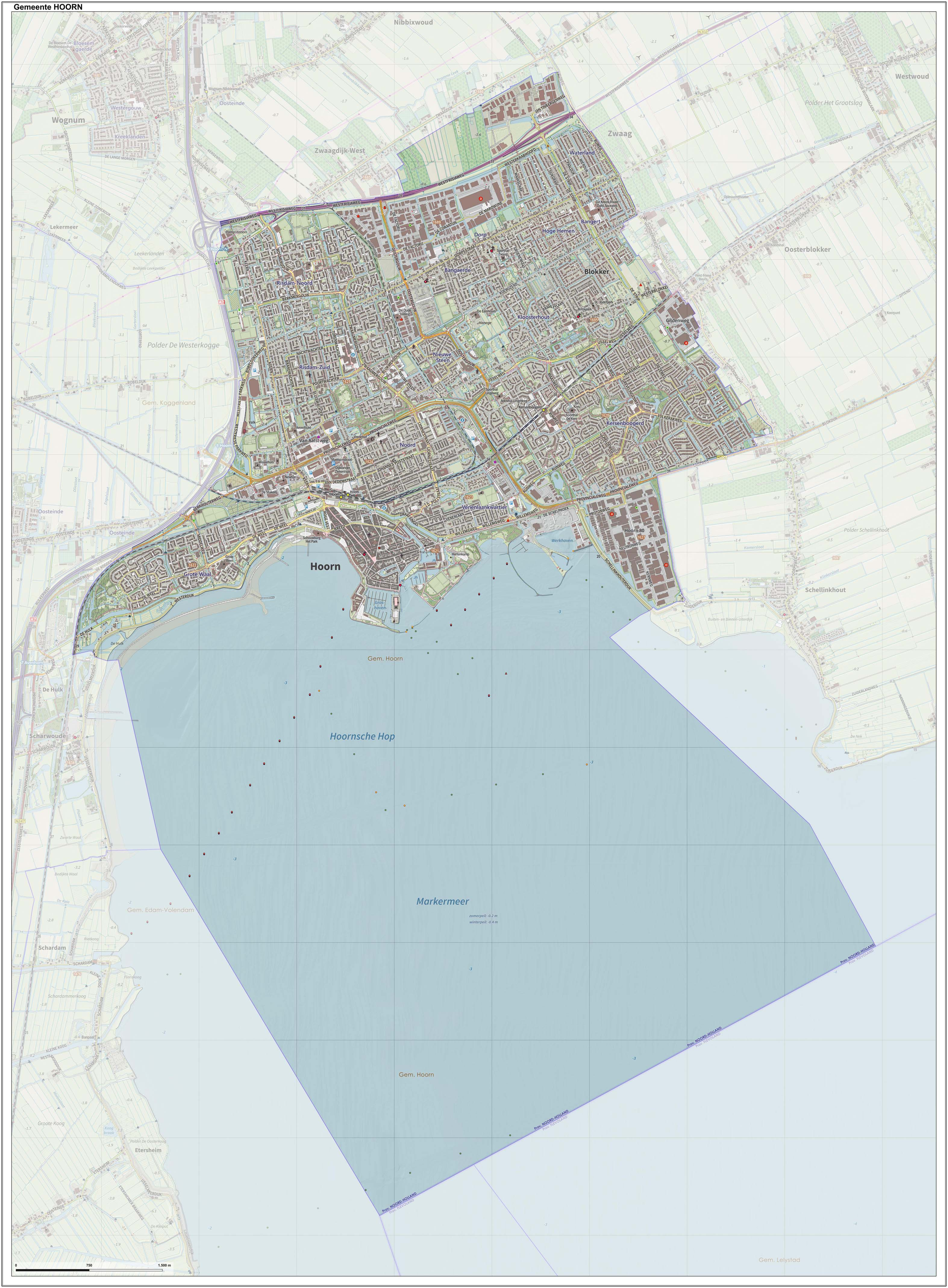
Map of Hoorn (2019)

Hoorn is located in northern North Holland, on the northwestern shore of the Markermeer – the second largest freshwater lake of the Netherlands. The city occupies an arc of land at the northernmost end of a small bay named Hoornse Hop. The landscape of Hoorn is mostly flat and the only elevated areas are the dikes on the southern outskirts of the city. Its harbor contains an artificial peninsula, Visserseiland, and an artificial island, Oostereiland, which were both constructed in the mid-seventeenth century.

=== Climate ===
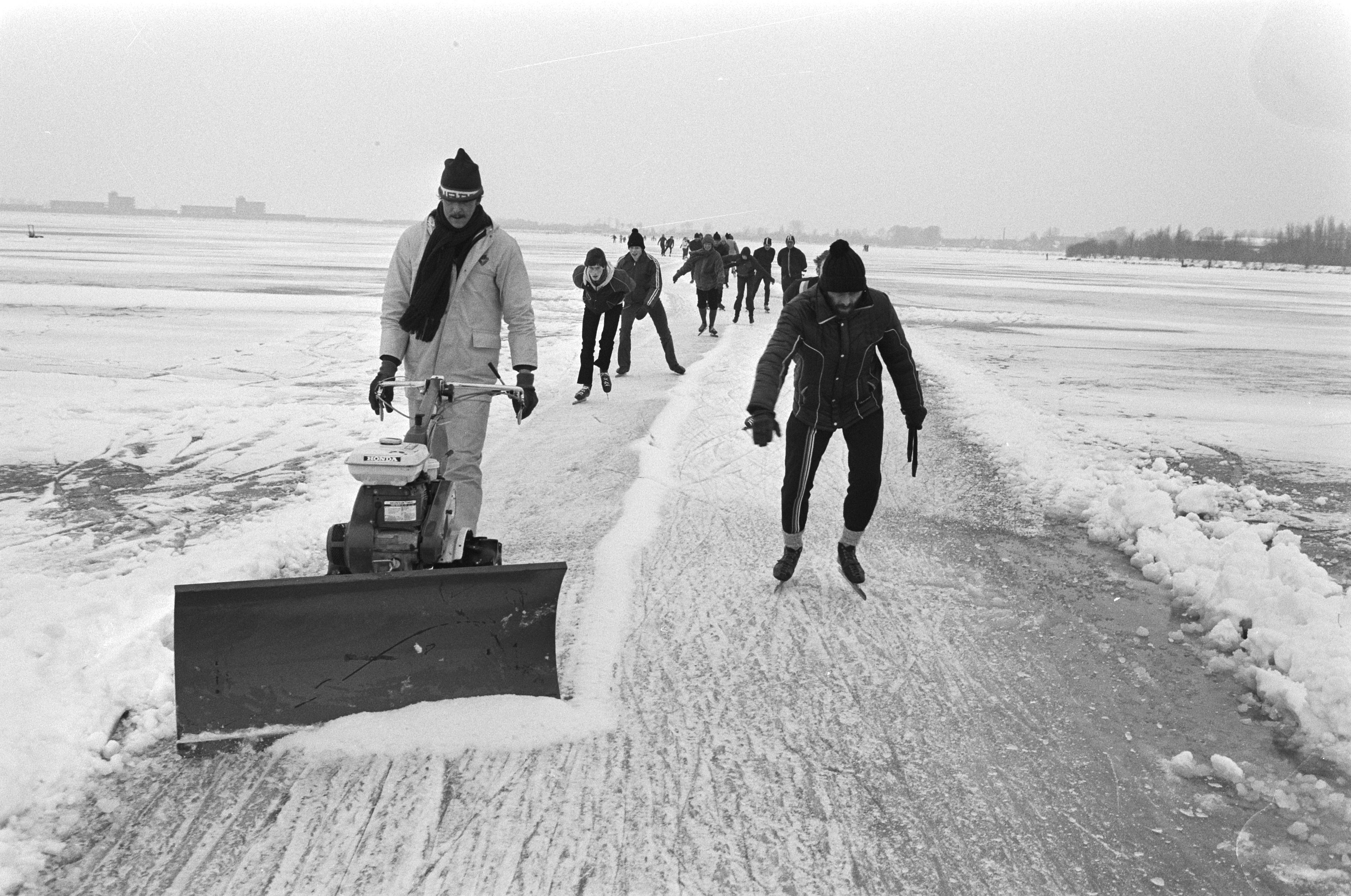
Tour skating from Hoorn to Warder over a frozen Markermeer (1981)

Hoorn has an oceanic climate (Köppen: Cfb) strongly influenced by its proximity to the North Sea to the west, with prevailing westerly winds. Both winters and summers are considered mild, although winters can get quite cold, while summers are quite warm occasionally.

Hoorn, as well as most of the North Holland province, lies in USDA hardiness zone 8b. Frosts mainly occur during spells of easterly or northeasterly winds from the inner European continent. Even then, because Hoorn is surrounded on three sides by large bodies of water, nights rarely fall far below 0 °C (32 °F).

Summers are moderately warm with a number of hot days every month. The average daily high in August is 21.6 °C (70.9 °F), and 30 °C (86 °F) or higher is only measured on 1.8 days per year on average (2009–2018), placing Hoorn in AHS heat zone 2. It is also common to have at least a couple of snowy days each year.

The Royal Netherlands Meteorological Institute has one of its weather stations located in Berkhout, a village situated west of Hoorn. Climatological data from this station can be found in the table below. The record extremes range from −21.9 °C (−7.4 °F) to 34.6 °C (94.3 °F). The average annual precipitation is 855.5 millimetres (34 in).

Climate data for Berkhout
Month	Jan	Feb	Mar	Apr	May	Jun	Jul	Aug	Sep	Oct	Nov	Dec	Year
Record high °C (°F)	14.8 (58.6)	18.0 (64.4)	22.3 (72.1)	27.1 (80.8)	29.8 (85.6)	32.5 (90.5)	35.7 (96.3)	33.0 (91.4)	29.7 (85.5)	25.0 (77.0)	19.1 (66.4)	15.8 (60.4)	35.7 (96.3)
Mean daily maximum °C (°F)	5.5 (41.9)	5.9 (42.6)	9.1 (48.4)	12.9 (55.2)	17.0 (62.6)	19.2 (66.6)	21.6 (70.9)	21.6 (70.9)	18.4 (65.1)	14.2 (57.6)	9.5 (49.1)	6.2 (43.2)	13.4 (56.1)
Daily mean °C (°F)	3.2 (37.8)	3.3 (37.9)	5.7 (42.3)	8.8 (47.8)	12.7 (54.9)	15.1 (59.2)	17.5 (63.5)	17.4 (63.3)	14.6 (58.3)	11.0 (51.8)	7.0 (44.6)	3.9 (39.0)	10.0 (50.0)
Mean daily minimum °C (°F)	0.7 (33.3)	0.6 (33.1)	2.6 (36.7)	4.6 (40.3)	8.2 (46.8)	10.8 (51.4)	13.2 (55.8)	13.1 (55.6)	10.7 (51.3)	7.8 (46.0)	4.3 (39.7)	1.5 (34.7)	6.5 (43.7)
Record low °C (°F)	−15.4 (4.3)	−21.9 (−7.4)	−18.7 (−1.7)	−6.5 (20.3)	−1.7 (28.9)	3.5 (38.3)	6.7 (44.1)	6.3 (43.3)	2.2 (36.0)	−4.4 (24.1)	−6.7 (19.9)	−10.0 (14.0)	−21.9 (−7.4)
Average precipitation mm (inches)	74.9 (2.95)	58.1 (2.29)	51.1 (2.01)	43.3 (1.70)	56.0 (2.20)	49.5 (1.95)	76.0 (2.99)	108.8 (4.28)	78.1 (3.07)	87.2 (3.43)	85.4 (3.36)	87.1 (3.43)	855.5 (33.66)
Average relative humidity (%)	88	85	84	79	78	79	79	81	84	86	88	89	83
Mean monthly sunshine hours	71.5	98.4	152.7	208.5	240.4	224.5	233.9	202.5	162.7	125.0	67.9	59.4	1,847.4
Source 1: Royal Netherlands Meteorological Institute (1981–2010 normals, relative humidity)
Source 2: Weergegevens.nl (2000–2019 extremes, precipitation, sunshine hours)

=== Districts ===
The municipality of Hoorn consists of the city of Hoorn (postal codes 1620–1628) and the villages of Zwaag (postal code 1689) and Blokker (postal code 1695), which are further divided into the following districts:

Districts of Hoorn

No.	District	Population (2019)	Postal code
1	Binnenstad (city center)	5,570	1621
2	Grote Waal	7,680	1622
3	Venenlaankwartier	2,575	1623
4	Hoorn-Noord	5,460	1624
5	Risdam-Zuid	8,555	1625
6	Nieuwe Steen	1,250	1625
7	Hoorn 80	10	1627
8	Kersenboogerd-Zuid	16,965	1628
9	Kersenboogerd-Noord	3,945	1628
10	Risdam-Noord	7,840	1689
11	Zwaag	3,145	1689
12	Zevenhuis	0	1689
13	Bangert en Oosterpolder	6,165	1689, 1695
14	Westerblokker	3,815	1695

== Cityscape ==
=== Notable buildings ===
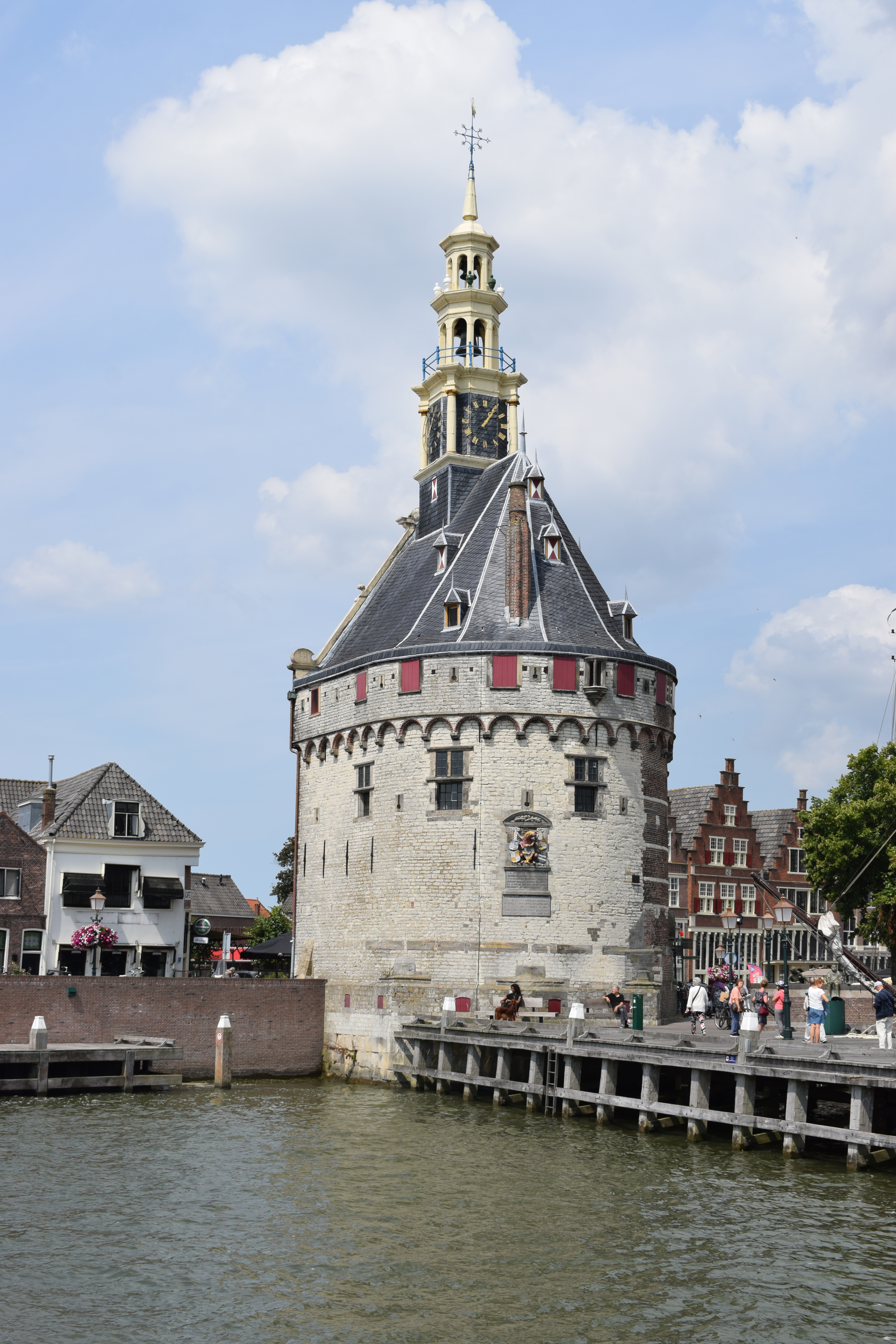
Hoofdtoren (1464), the former harbor control tower

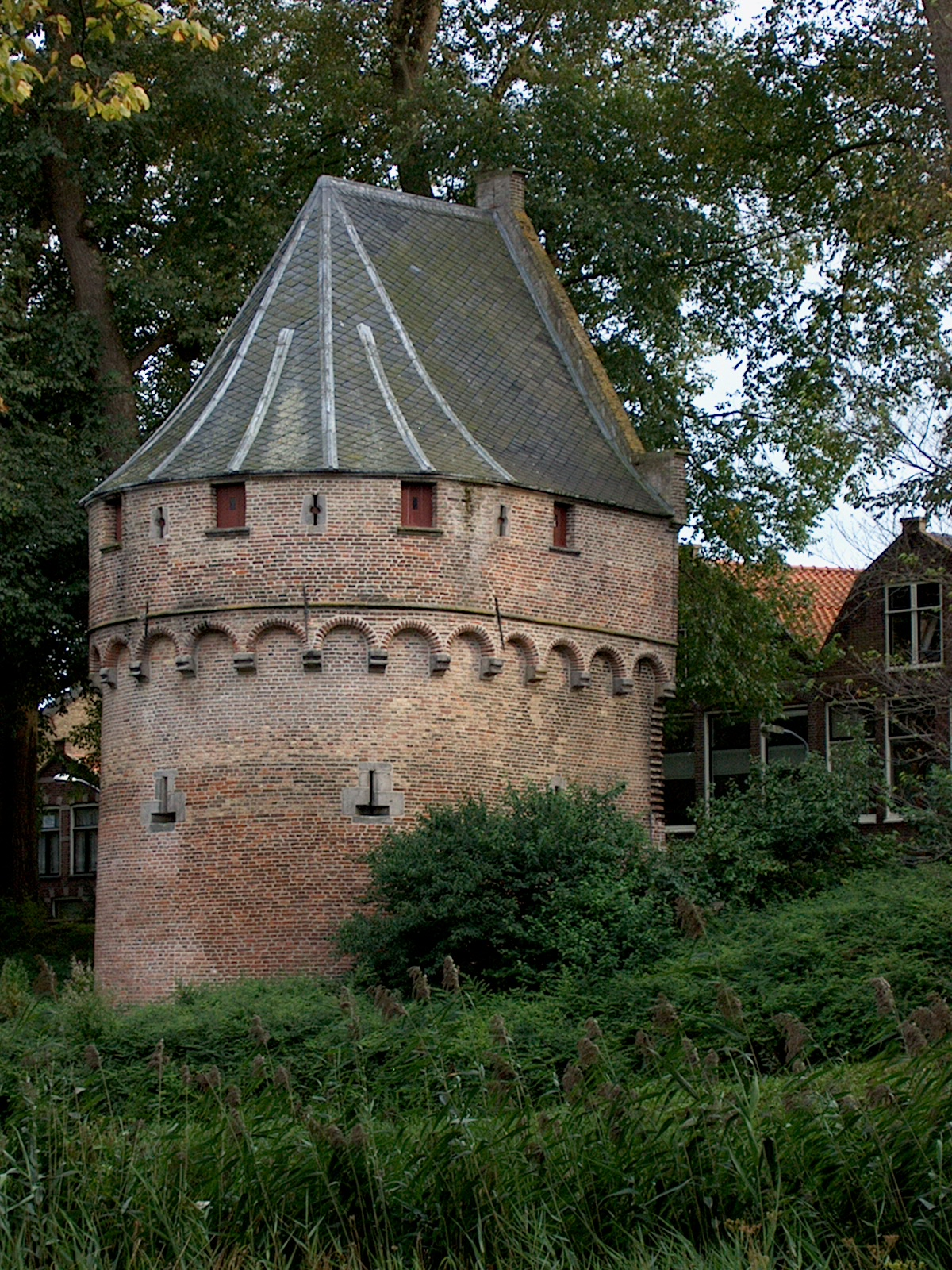
Mariatoren (1508), a tower built in late gothic style as part of the city wall

Oosterpoort (1578), the only remaining city gate

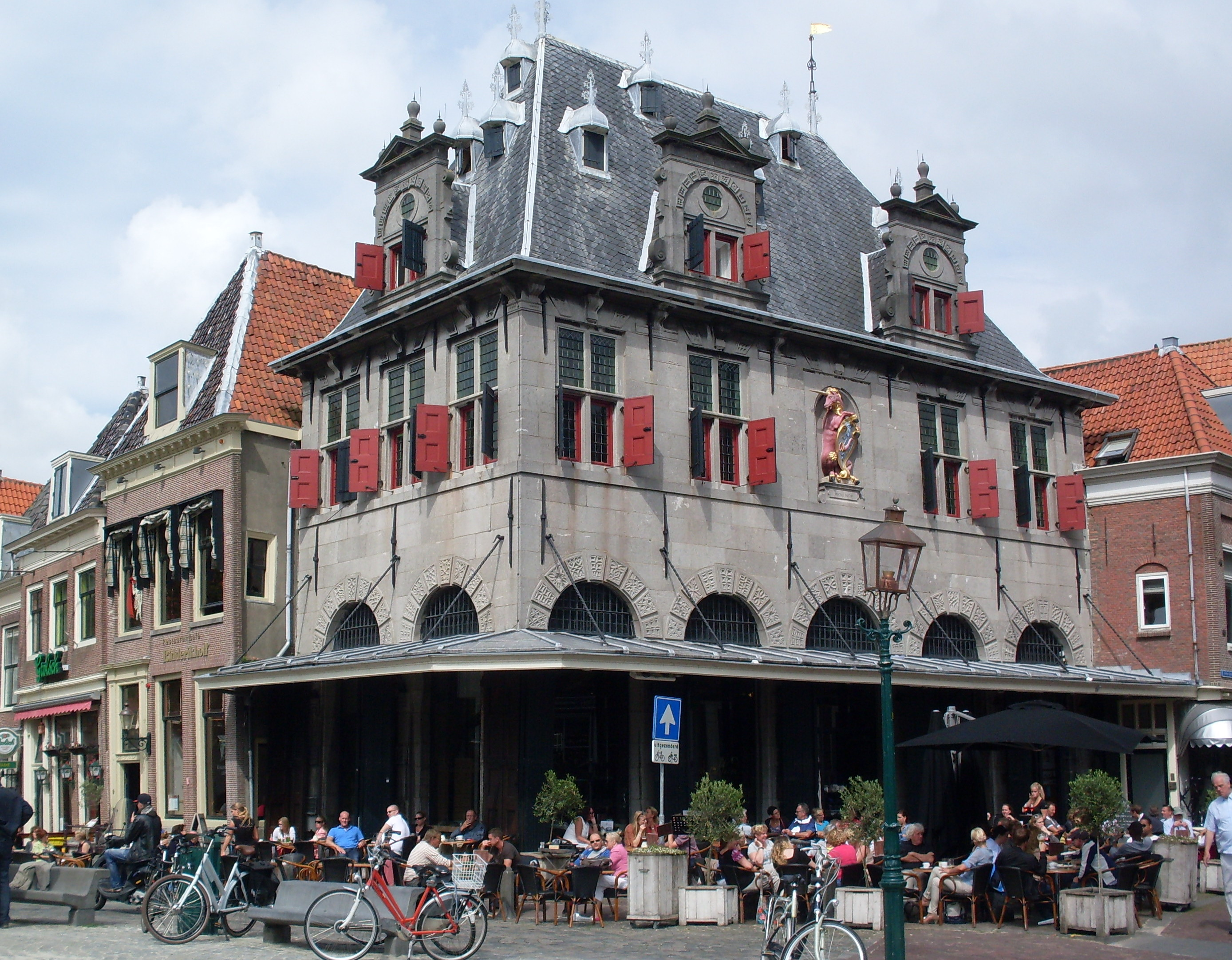
Waag (1609), weighhouse at the junction of Grote Oost and Roode Steen

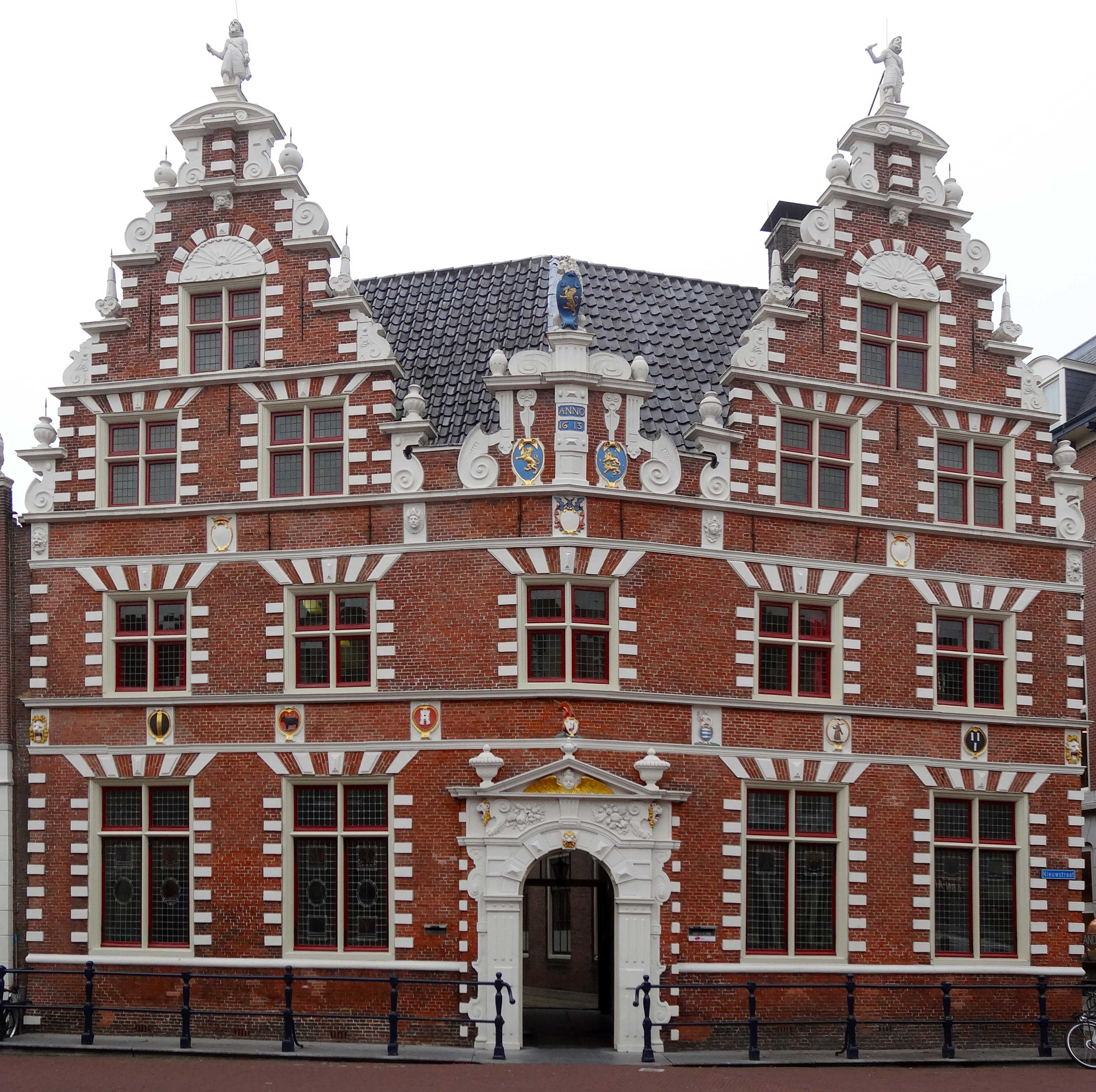
Statenlogement (1613), former city hall

Statencollege (1632), former regional administrative seat

Koepelkerk (1882), a Roman Catholic basilica

Schouwburg Het Park (2004), a theater and congress center

=== Museums ===
- Westfries Museum
- Museum of the 20th Century

=== Cemeteries ===
- Jewish cemetery, Hoorn

== Administration ==
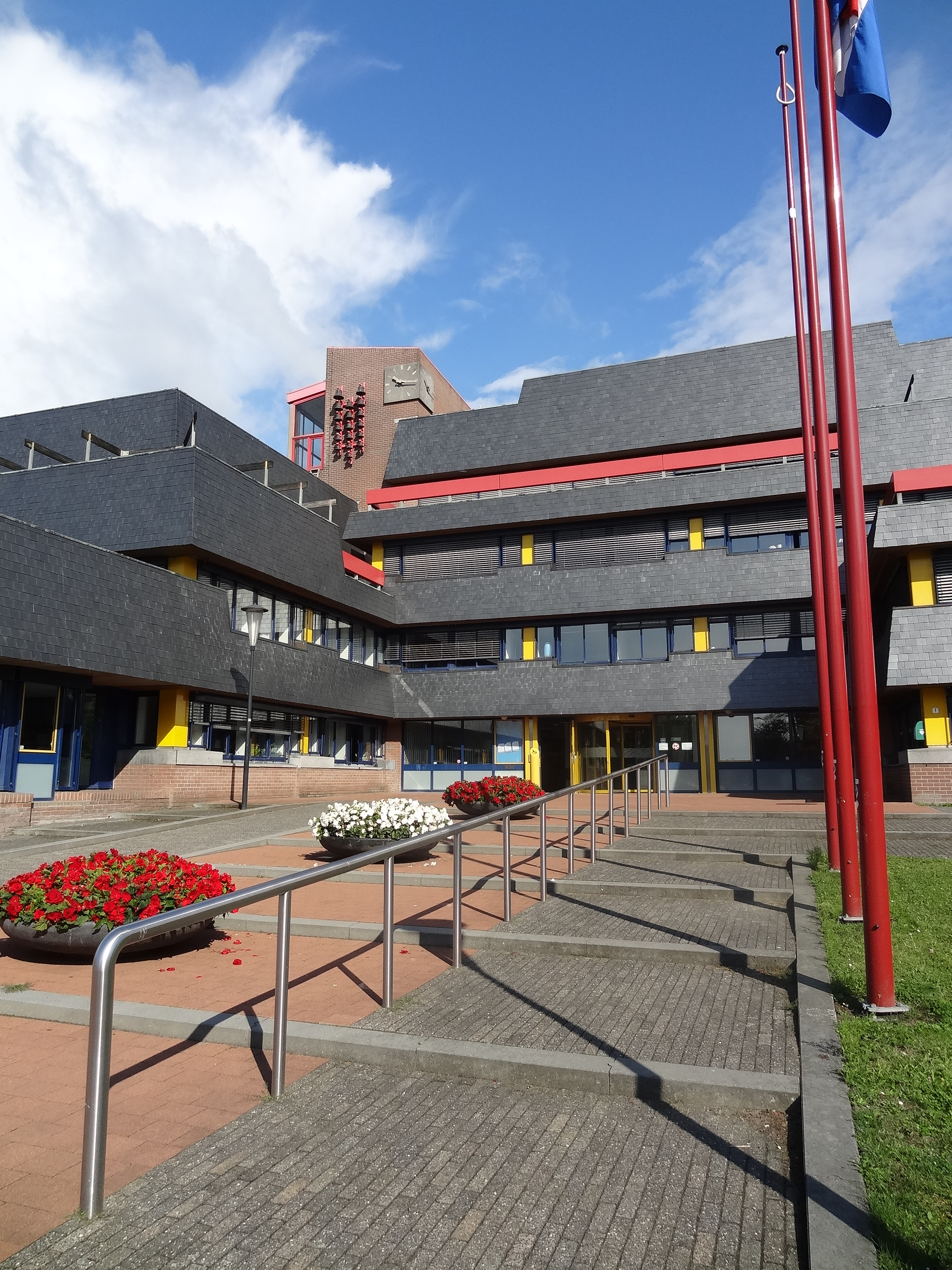
Hoorn city hall

=== Municipal council ===
Municipal election result, 2026
Party	%	Seats
Hart van Hoorn (HvH)	14.28	6
Progressief Nederland (Pro)	13.67	6
Hoorn Lokaal (HL)	10.99	4
People's Party for Freedom and Democracy (VVD)	8.71	3
Democrats 66 (D66)	8.60	3
Forum voor Democratie (FVD)	7.83	3
Christian Democratic Appeal (CDA)	7.51	3
Sociaal Hoorn/Team Tonnaer	6.75	2
ÉénHoorn	4.00	1
Hoorn Centraal	3.70	1
Partij voor de Dieren (PvdD)	3.19	1
Hoornse Ondernemende & Ouderen Partij (HOOP!)	2.60	1
Socialist Party (SP)	2.50	1
Total		35

=== Municipal executive ===
As of 2026, the municipal executive of Hoorn consists of:

- Jan Nieuwenburg (Pro), mayor
- Dennis Boutkan (Pro)
- René Assendelft (HL)
- Yousuf Yousufi (VVD)
- Niek Heijne (D66)
- Diana Dekker (CDA)

== Infrastructure ==
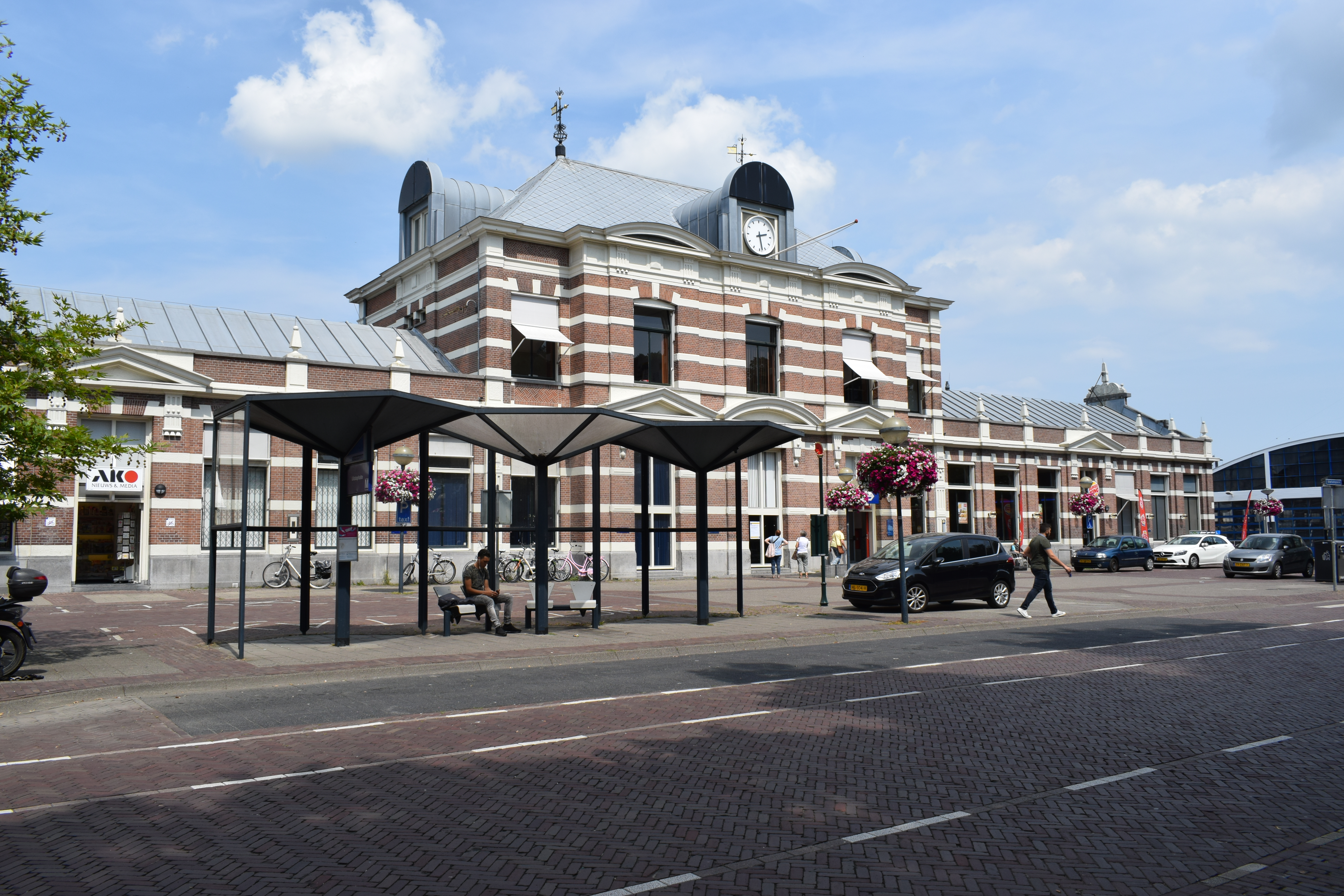
Hoorn railway station

=== Railways ===
Hoorn is connected to the Dutch railway network and has two train stations: Hoorn and Hoorn Kersenboogerd. From these stations, it is possible to travel in the directions of Enkhuizen, Alkmaar and Amsterdam. It is also the starting point of the Hoorn–Medemblik heritage railway.

=== Roads ===
The A7 motorway, which runs from Zaandam to the German border via the Afsluitdijk, passes along Hoorn. The exit Hoorn North connects to the provincial road N302, also called Westfrisiaweg, which runs from Hoorn to Lelystad via the Houtribdijk.

== Notable people ==
=== Born ===
The following is a list of notable people who were born in Hoorn:

==== Public figures ====
- Hadrianus Junius (1511–1575), humanist
- Cornelis Cort (ca. 1533 – ca. 1578), engraver
- Rombout Hogerbeets (1561–1625), jurist
- Willem Schouten (ca. 1567–1625), explorer
- Jonas Michaelius (1577 – after 1638), clergyman
- Cornelius Jacobsen May (ca. 1580 – after 1624), explorer
- Willem Bontekoe (1587–1657), explorer
- Jan Pieterszoon Coen (1587–1629), colonial administrator
- Jacques Waben (ca. 1590 – ca. 1634), painter
- Pieter Anthoniszoon Overtwater (ca. 1610–1682), merchant
- Birgitta Durell (1619–1683), Swedish industrialist
- Pieter Coopse (c. 1640–1673), painter and draughtsman
- Jacob Rotius (1644–1681), painter
- Martinus Houttuyn (1720–1798), botanist
- Adrianus Bleijs (1842–1912), architect
- Johan Messchaert (1857–1922), singer
- Aaf Bouber (1885–1974), actress
- Maria Elizabeth van Ebbenhorst Tengbergen (1885–1980), composer
- Bart Bok (1906–1983), American astronomer
- Anton Quintana (1937–2017), writer
- Corine Rottschäfer (1938–2020), model
- Martin Brozius (1941–2009), actor
- George Baker (born 1944), singer
- Cees Renckens (born 1946), physician
- Joop van Wijk (1950–2022), director
- Simone van der Vlugt (born 1966), writer
- Ron Blaauw (1967), chef
- Richard Tol (born 1969), economist
- Jan van Steenbergen (born 1970), linguist
- Maria Barnas (born 1973), writer and poet
- Wytske Postma (born 1977), politician
- Marieke Vellinga-Beemsterboer (born 1986), politician
- Tim Knol (born 1989), singer-songwriter
- Stien den Hollander (born 2000), singer and rapper
- Rikkie Kollé (born 2001), model

==== Sportspeople ====
- Johannes van Hoolwerff (1878–1962), Olympic sailor
- Frans Hoek (born 1956), football player
- Ruud Heus (born 1961), football player
- Stephan van den Berg (born 1962), Olympic windsurfer
- Silvan Inia (born 1969), football player
- Frank de Boer (born 1970), football player
- Ronald de Boer (born 1970), football player
- Minouche Smit (born 1975), swimmer
- Marja Vis (born 1977), speed skater
- Marcelien de Koning (born 1978), Olympic sailor
- Vera Koedooder (born 1983), racing cyclist
- Coen de Koning (born 1983), Olympic sailor
- Tine Veenstra (born 1983), bobsledder
- Adrie Visser (born 1983), track cyclist
- Wil Besseling (born 1985), golfer
- Willemijn Karsten (born 1986), handball player
- Robert Krabbendam (born 1986), basketball player
- Pim Ligthart (born 1988), road cyclist
- Ruud Vormer (born 1988), football player
- Maikel van der Werff (born 1989), football player
- Roland Alberg (born 1990), football player
- Nadine Broersen (born 1990), track and field athlete
- Marco Bizot (born 1991), football player
- Lorenzo Ebecilio (born 1991), football player
- Nicole Koolhaas (born 1991), volleyball player
- Brandley Kuwas (born 1992), football player
- Sonny Stevens (born 1992), football player
- Paul Kok (born 1994), football player
- Bas Schouten (born 1994), racing driver
- Nadine Visser (born 1995), track athlete
- Inessa Kaagman (born 1996), football player
- Maaike Boogaard (born 1998), racing cyclist
- Dani de Wit (born 1998), football player
- Dagmar Boom (born 2000), volleyball player
- Kenzo Goudmijn (born 2001), football player
- Sontje Hansen (born 2002), football player

=== Residing ===
The following is a list of people who were born elsewhere, but are notable (former) residents of Hoorn:

- David Pietersz. de Vries (ca. 1593–1655), explorer
- Andreas Cellarius (1596–1665), cartographer
- Jan Albertsz Rotius (1624–1666), painter
- Miep Gies (1909–2010), helper of the Frank family
- Edgar Vos (1931–2010), fashion designer
- Milly Scott (born 1933), singer and actress
- Bonnie St. Claire (born 1949), singer
- Ernesto Hoost (born 1965), kickboxer
- Sylvana Simons (born 1971), presenter and politician
- Steven van Weyenberg (born 1973), politician
- Lobke Berkhout (born 1980), Olympic sailor
- Dean Saunders (born 1981), singer
- Ben Saunders (1983–2026), singer

== International relations ==
=== Partner cities ===
Hoorn is twinned with the following cities and municipalities:

- Beersel, Belgium (since 1968) (Note: Initiated by Blokker and Lot, before they merged into their respective municipalities in the 1970s.)
- Příbram, Czech Republic (since 1992)

=== Friendships ===
- Lewes, Delaware, United States

Lewes was the site of the first European settlement in Delaware: a whaling and trading post that Dutch settlers led by David Pieterszoon de Vries established in 1631 and named Zwaanendael. Upon their arrival in the Delaware Bay, they entered a kill which De Vries named "Hoornkill" after his hometown. Nowadays, the city's Zwaanendael Museum is located in a replica of the Statenlogement, the former city hall of Hoorn. Although Hoorn and Lewes have never officially been partner cities, there is close informal relationship between the two towns. Delegations from Hoorn and Lewes have visited each other's cities in light of Lewes's 375th and Hoorn's 650th anniversary in 2006 and 2007 respectively.

- Malacca City, Malaysia (since 1989)

In 1641, the Dutch conquered the colony of Malacca from the Portuguese. During the Dutch rule, the Stadthuys was built – a replica of the first city hall of Hoorn, which was demolished in 1797. Hoorn and Malacca became sister cities in 1989, but the partnership was officially ended in 2005. The cities still maintain an informal relationship as "friendship cities".
