= Zwaag =

- Village
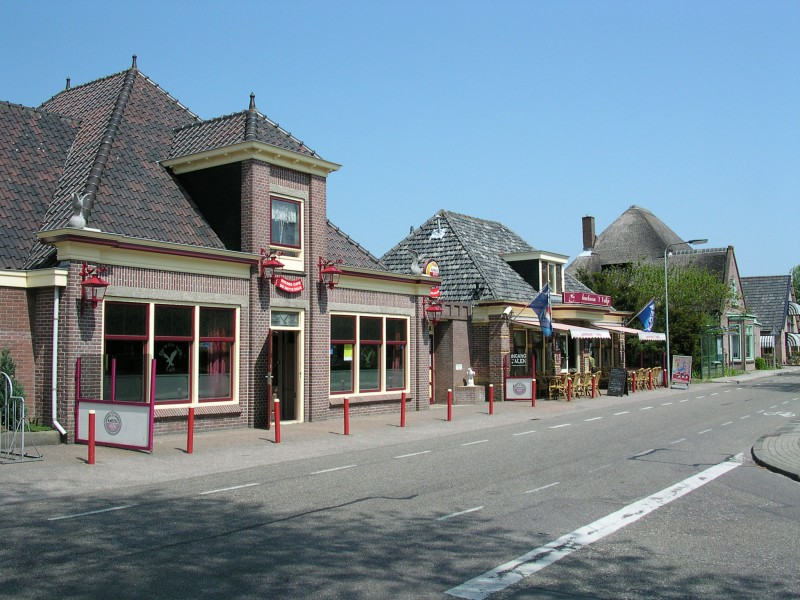
- Village centre

- Location in the Netherlands Location in the province of North Holland in the Netherlands
- Coordinates: 52.6679°N 5.0757°E
- Country: Netherlands
- Province: North Holland
- Municipality: Hoorn

Area
  - Total: 2.22 km^{2} (0.86 sq mi)
- Elevation: −0.9 m (−3.0 ft)

Population (2025)
  - Total: 3,255
  - Density: 1,470/km^{2} (3,800/sq mi)
- Time zone: UTC+1 (CET)
  - Summer (DST): UTC+2 (CEST)
- Postal code: 1689
- Dialing code: 0229

Zwaag (Dutch pronunciation: [zʋaːx]; West Frisian: Swaegh) is a village in the Netherlands. It is located in the municipality of Hoorn, the province of North Holland and the region of West Friesland.

== History ==
Zwaag was founded in the 13th century. The church tower is dated to around 1500. Originally, the population consisted of sailors and artisans. Zwaag was a town then, but it lost its city rights after prolonged disputes with nearby Hoorn. As of the 15th century, Zwaag was village of berry growers and dairy farmers. From 1900 onwards, more and more greenhouse were built for growing flowers. In 1979 it became part of Hoorn, in order for Hoorn to expand and take up surplus population of Amsterdam. Most of the land that belonged to Zwaag is now urbanized and on places where no houses are built, industrial zones have sprung up.

== Trivia ==
- The Dorpsstraat is the main road in Zwaag.
- The annual Carnival festival in Zwaag is one of the biggest in the northern parts of The Netherlands.
- Notable people from Zwaag include Marco Bizot, Ed Beers, Hans van Goor, Marike Groot and Richard Tol.

== Gallery ==
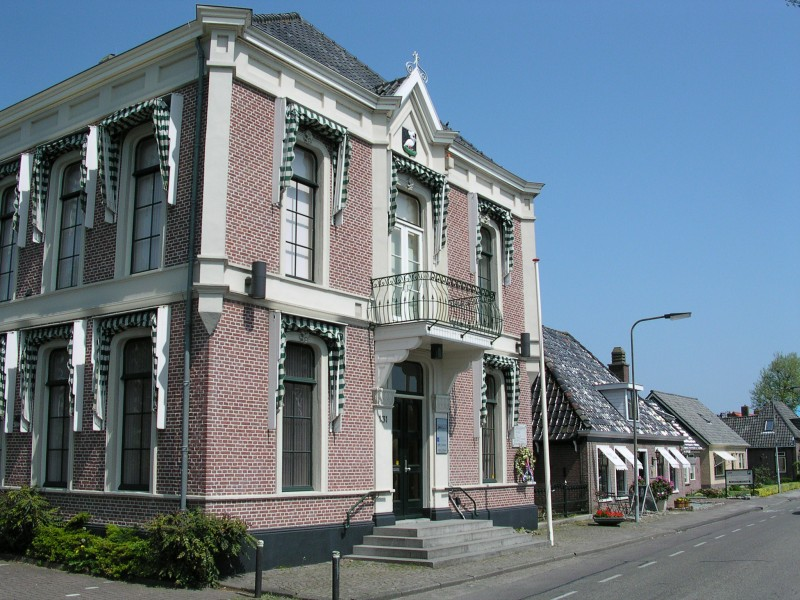
Former town hall

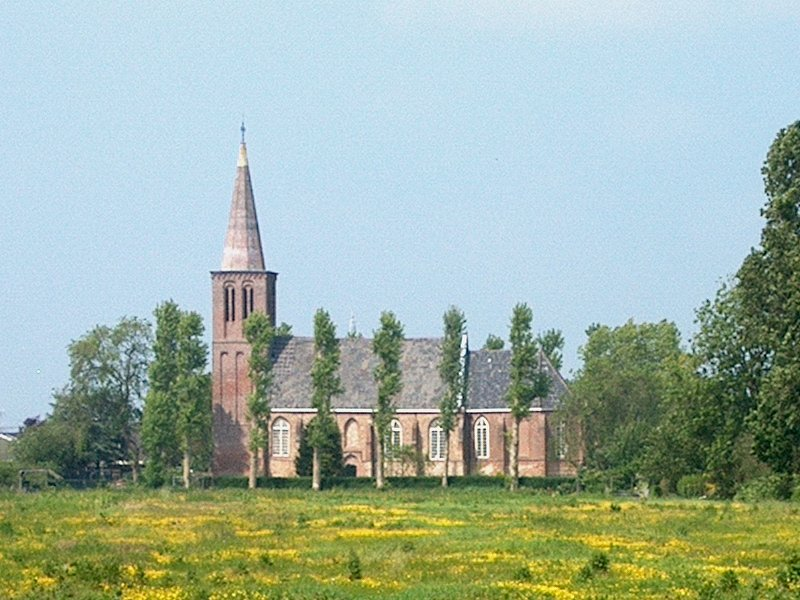
Dutch Reformed church

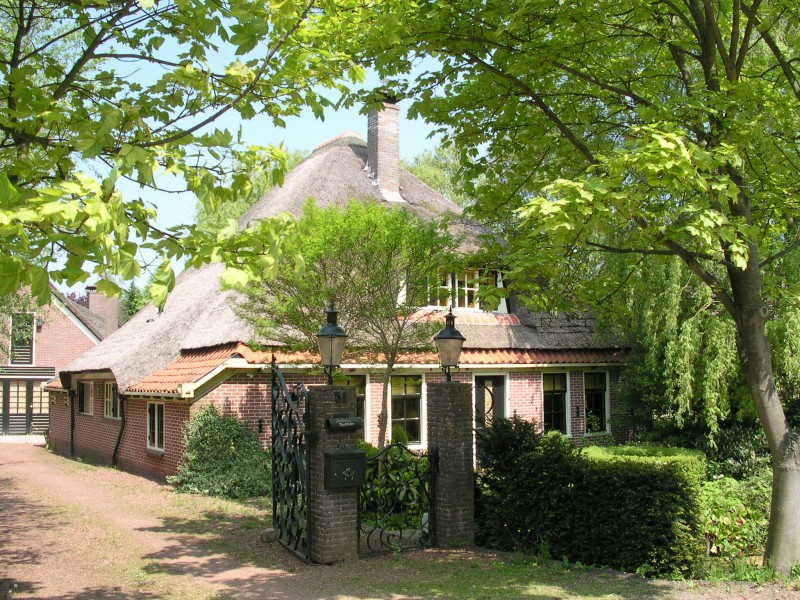
Stolp farm
