= Westfries Museum =

Museum in Hoorn, North Holland

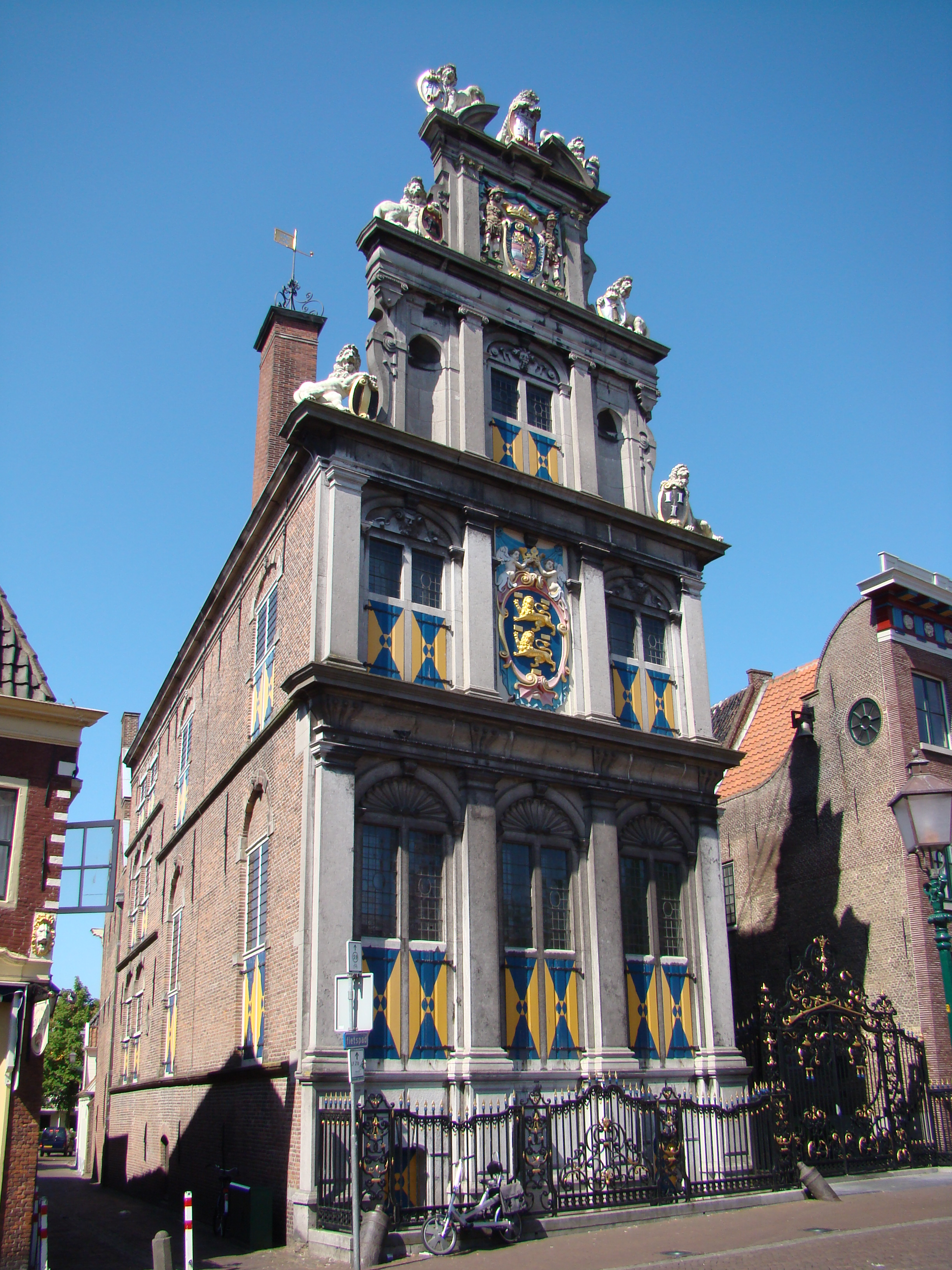
- Established: 10 January 1880
- Location: Hoorn, North Holland, Netherlands
- Coordinates: 52.639083°N 5.058917°E
- Type: Historical; Art
- Collection size: 30,000
- Director: Amanda Vollenweider
- Website: wfm.nl

The Westfries Museum, in Hoorn, Netherlands, is a history museum of 17th century Hoorn and the region.

== History ==
The museum was opened on 10 January 1880 and has been established in a monumental building dating to 1632. The museum building originally belonged to the Gecommitteerde Raden van West-Friesland en het Noorderkwartier, as a part of the Staten van Holland en West-Friesland, and later became a court. Until 1932 part of the building housed the kanton's court and part of its museum.

The museum has an extensive collection of paintings, silver objects, porcelain, historic firearms, objects of the schutterij and VOC objects. The collection is exhibited in 25 rooms, of which one is a style-room. In 1953, 15th century cellars were discovered under the building. These have been restored and are now used as exhibition spaces for archaeological objects from Hoorn and its surroundings.

The museum is supported by the Friends Foundation of the Westfries Museum that was set up on the initiative of the Westfries Society.

On 10 January 2005, the night the museum celebrated its 125th anniversary, four people stole 21 paintings of its paintings, including a piece by Jan van Goyen from his youth, and part of the silver collection, valued in the millions of euros. Four of the paintings were found in Ukraine in April 2016. Another painting by Jan Linsen was recovered from an apartment in Kraków, Poland in 2024.

== Stolen from the Westfries Museum ==
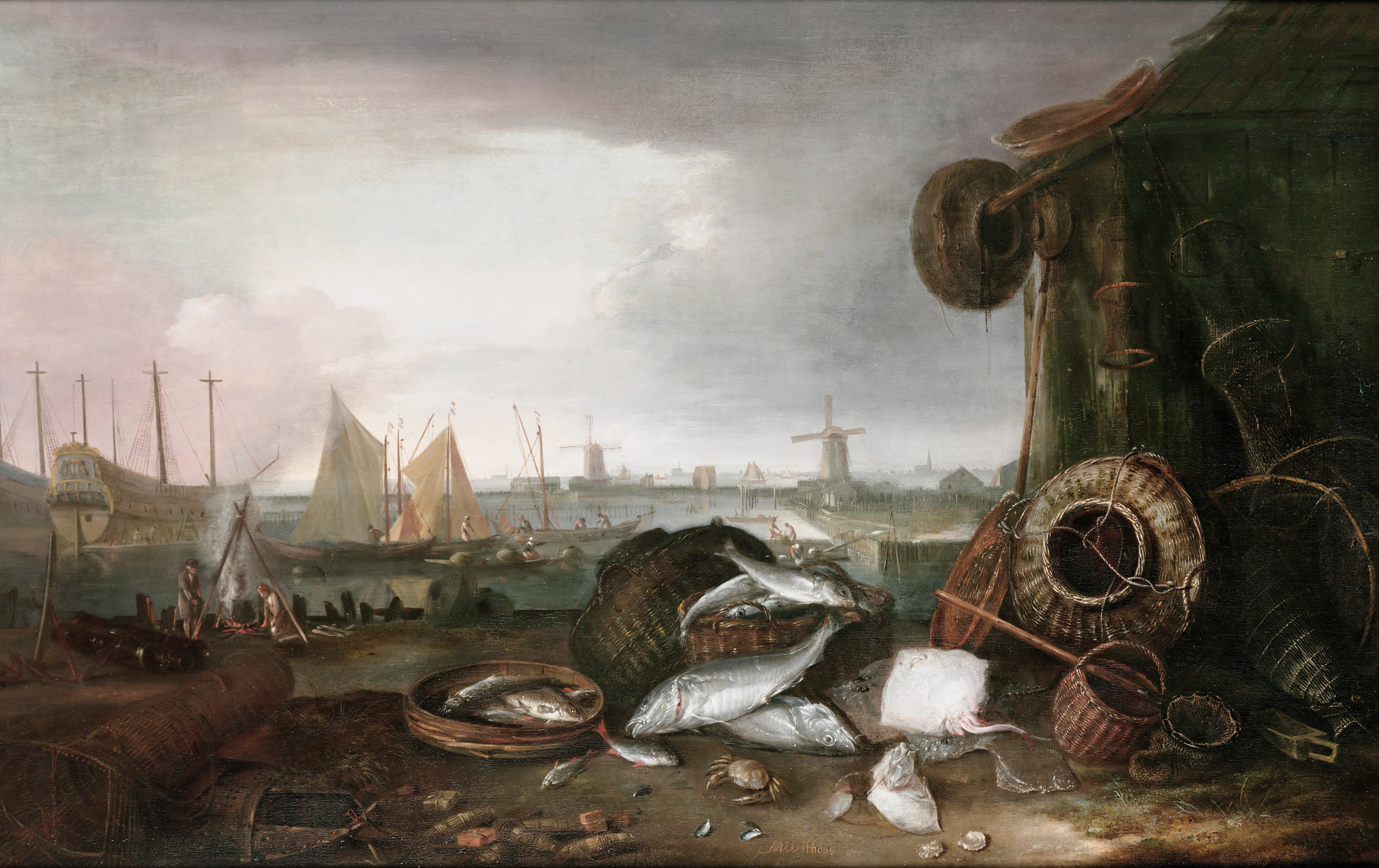
De Grashaven by Matthias Withoos

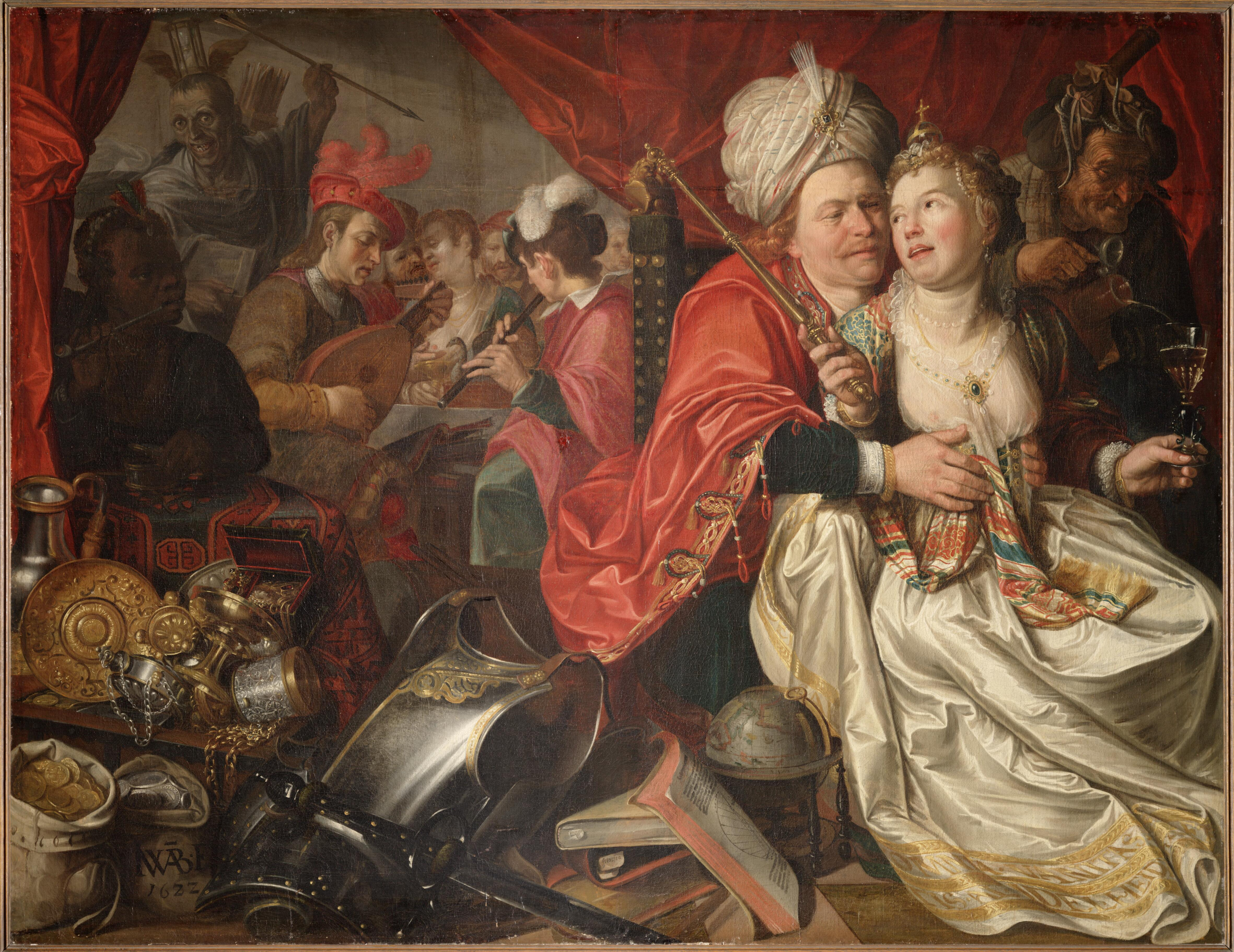
Vrouw Wereld by Jacob Waben (found in April 2016)

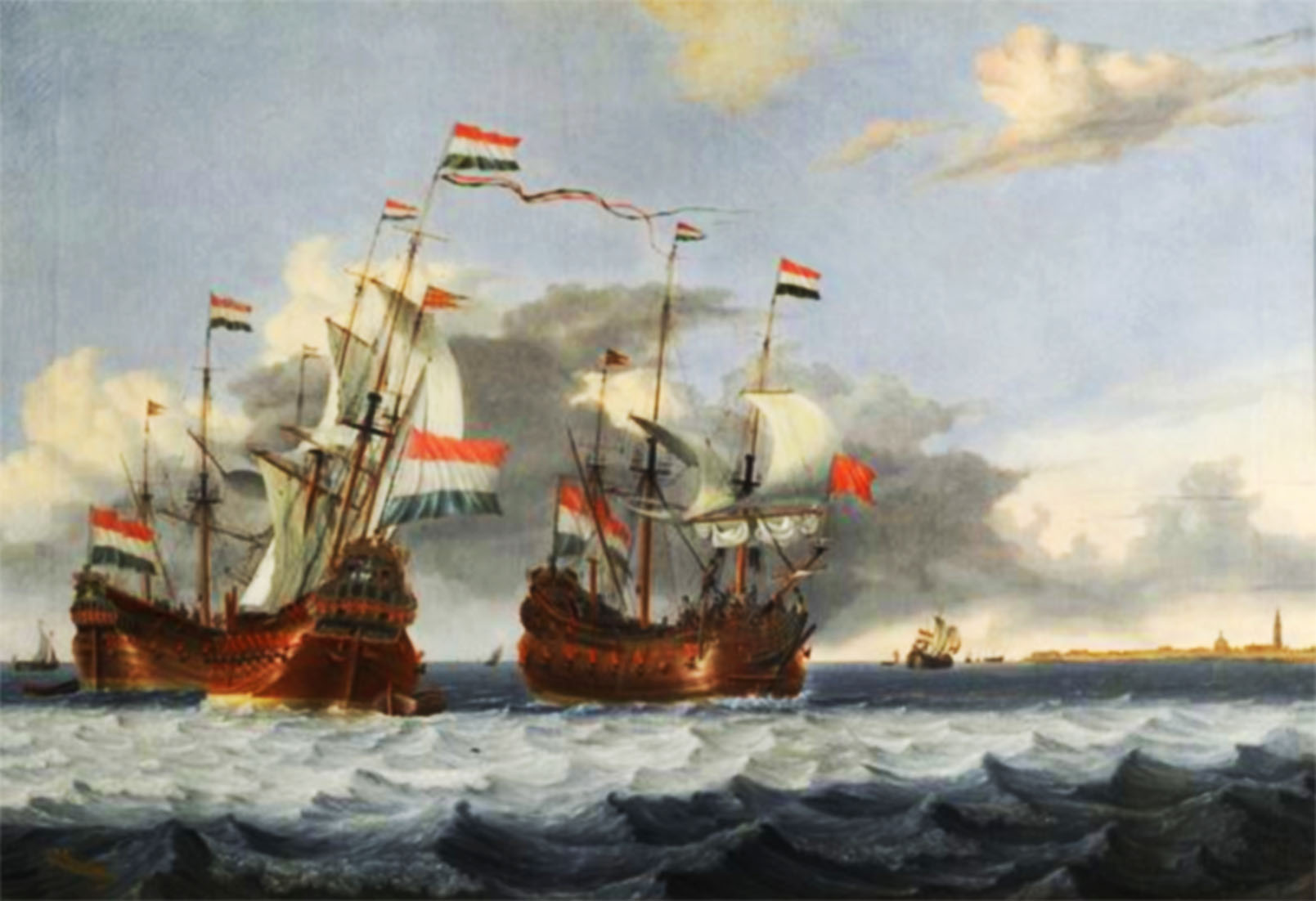
Gezicht op Enkhuizen by Gerrit Pompe

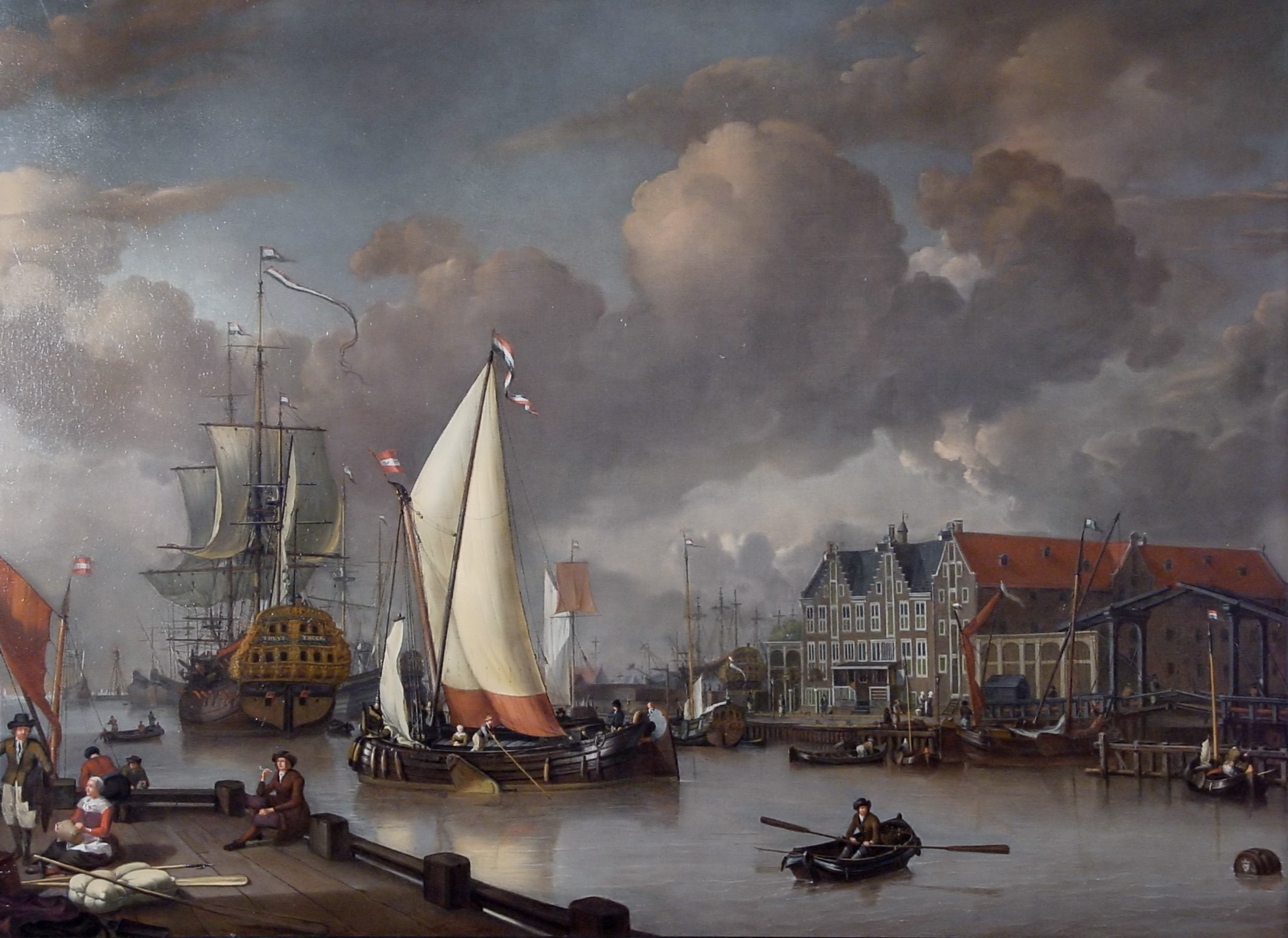
Gezicht op Oostereiland by Jan Claesz. Rietschoof

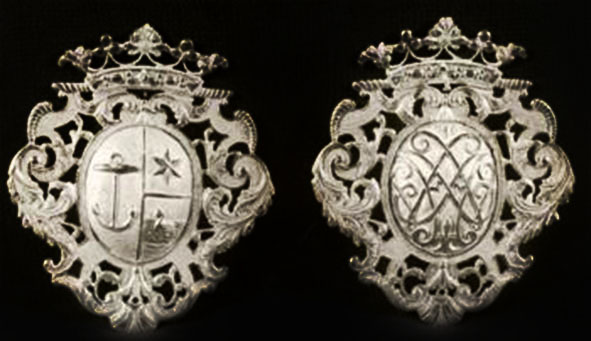
Golden book-locks

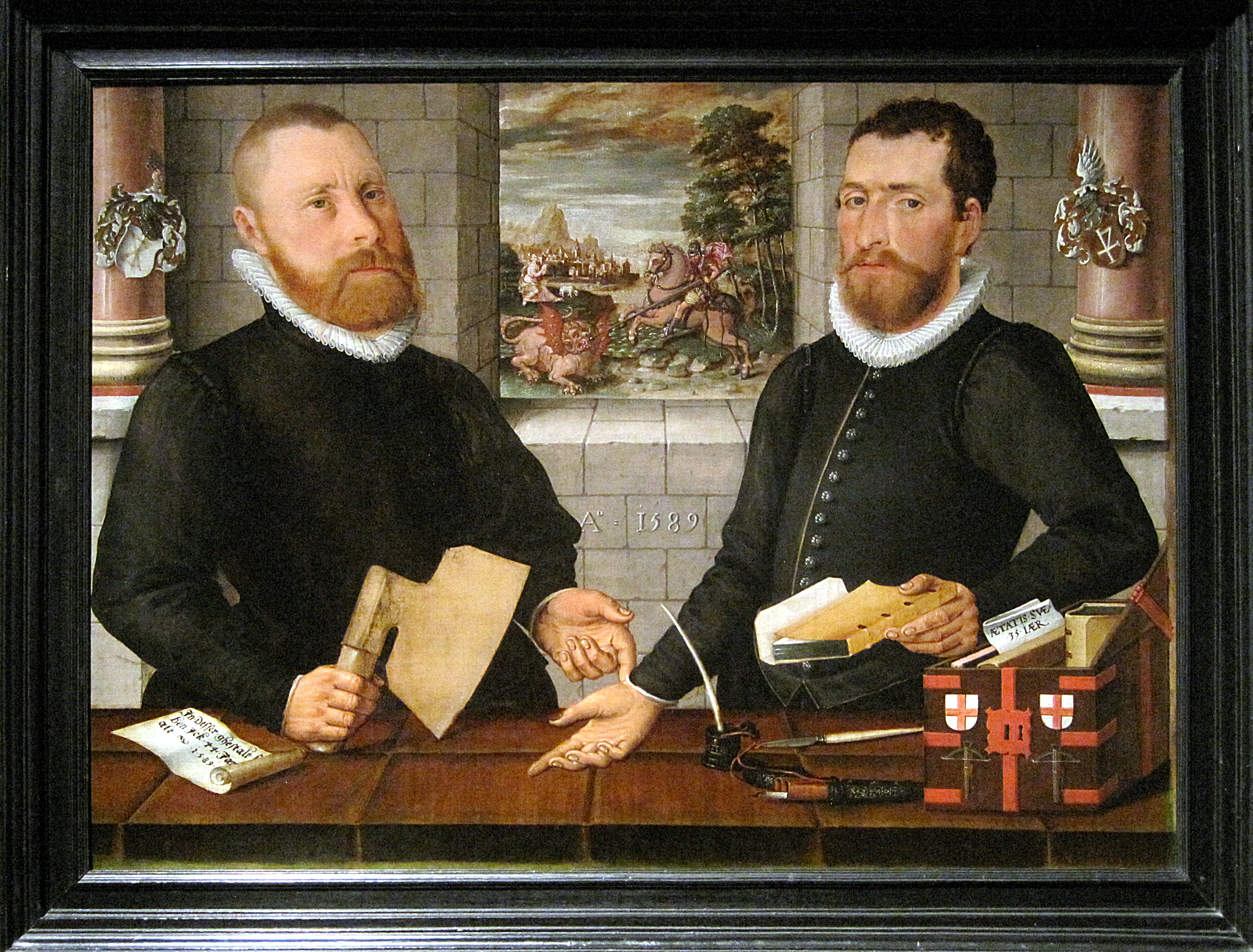
Portrait of two members of the Guild of Saint George (ca. 1589), author unknown.

== Renovations ==
As of 1 January 2023 the Westfries Museum is closed for extensive restoration and renovation. The museum complex from 1632 is getting new foundations. A basement to be built between the foundations with have space for temporary exhibitis. The building at Roode Steen 15 will become part of the museum. Renovations include creating a freely accessible reception area with a shop, food and beverage facilities, and inner garden access. When it reopens, the museum will continue to tell the story of 17th century Hoorn and the region.

There is a temporary Museum location in the Statenpoort on Nieuwstraat and museum website online exhibitions.
