= Oostereiland =

Artificial island in Hoorn, the Netherlands

Coordinates: 52°38′5″N 5°3′45″E

Location of Oostereiland in Hoorn

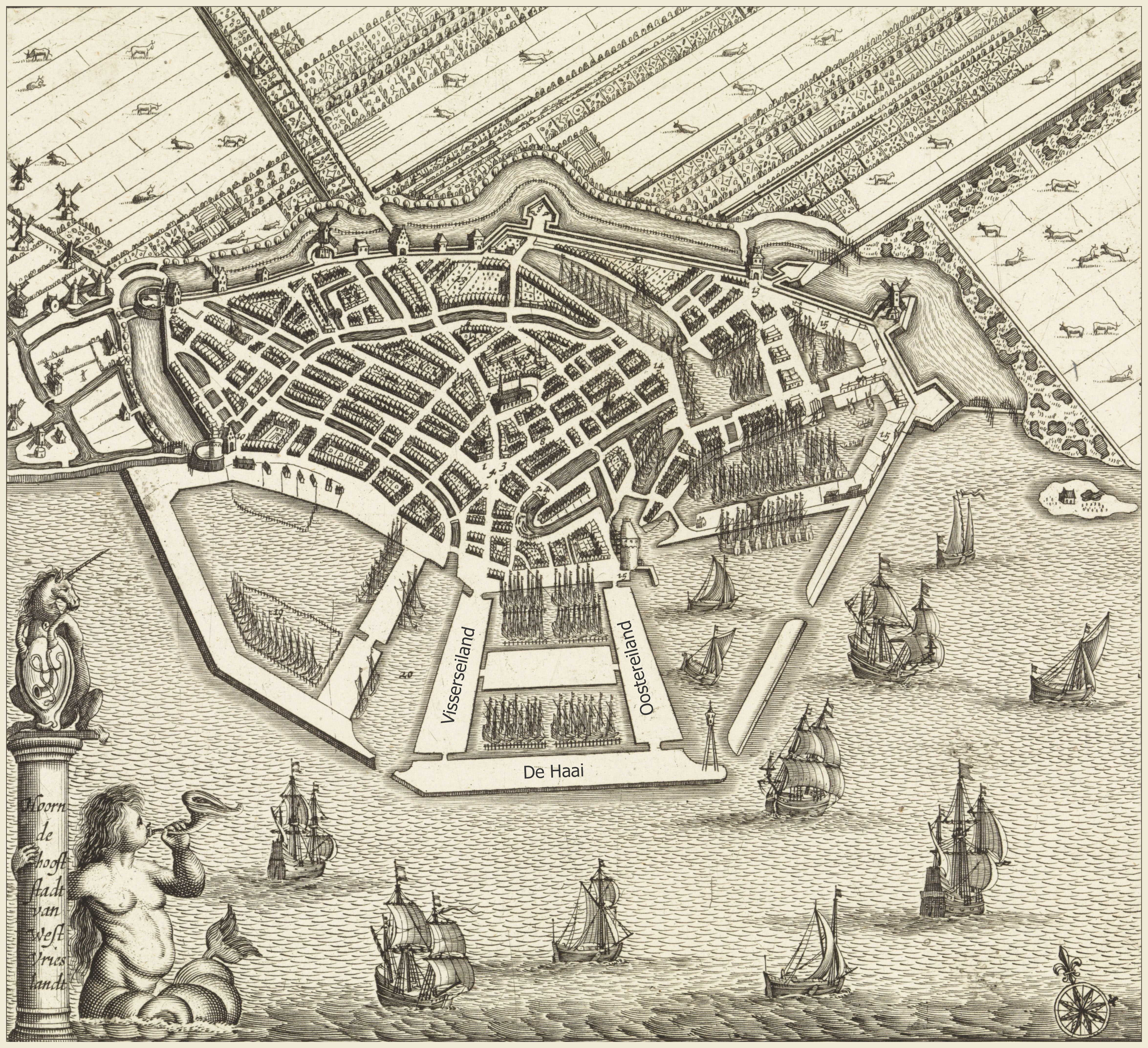
Map of Hoorn in 1648 showing the planned port

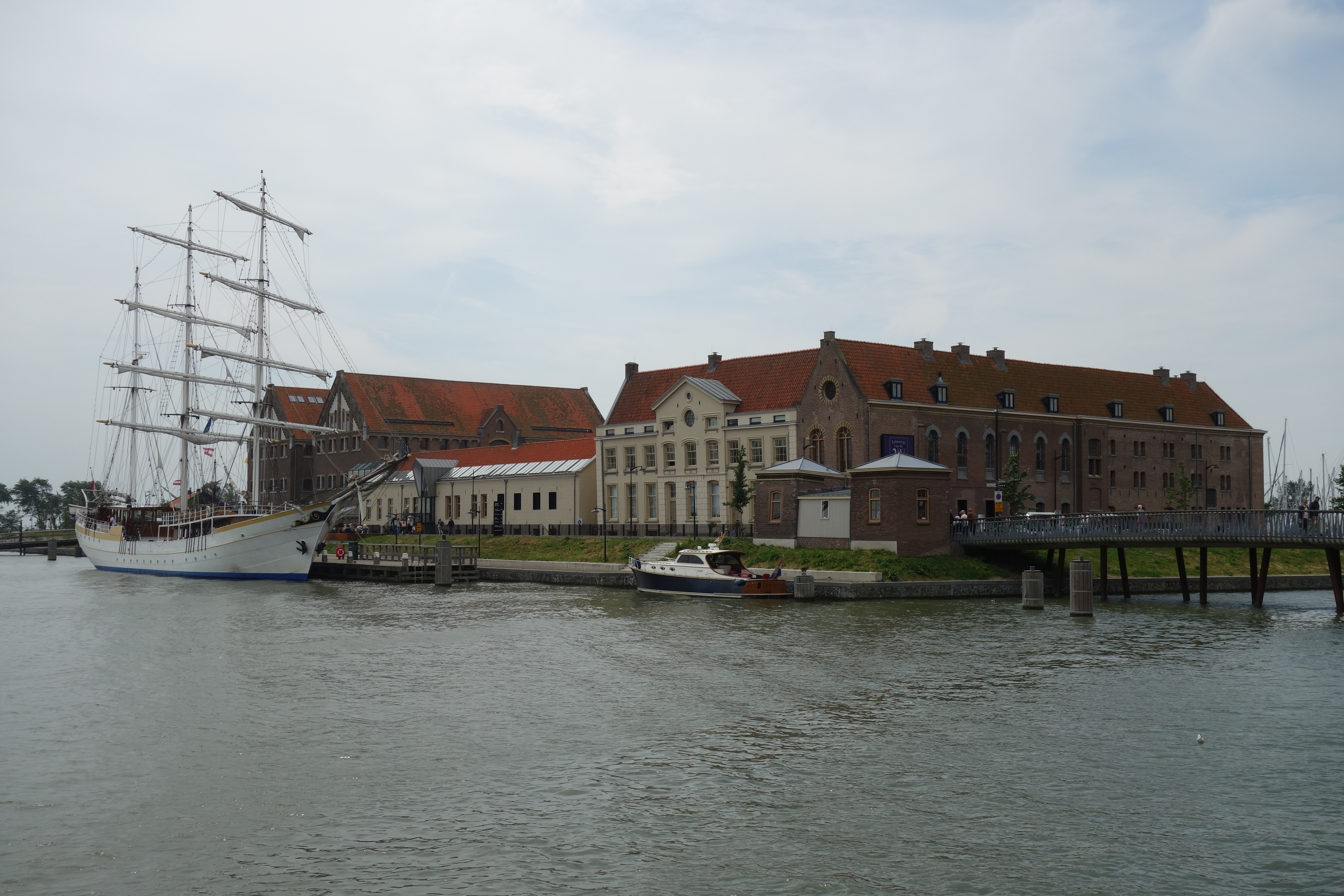
Oostereiland, former prison complex

The Oostereiland in the Dutch city of Hoorn is an artificial island built between 1662 and 1668. It was constructed from dams which were then raised and broadened. Soon after construction, homes and warehouses were built on the island, including a warehouse for the Admiralty of the Noorderkwartier.

== History ==
The Oostereiland as well as its companion the Visserseiland were planned and constructed in order to increased the harbor's capacity in the port city of Hoorn (then one of the most important cities of the Dutch East India Company as well as the Dutch West India Company). 1655 is often given as a starting date for the construction, but without much evidence. The island, plans for which existed in the 1640s already, was built using mud dredged from the two harbors, the Oosterhaven and the Westerhaven, which were deepened in the 1640-50s. According to C.P. Schrickx and D.M. Duijn, lead authors of a 2010 report based on an archaeological study done the year before, estimate that the island was built between 1650 and 1654; a document from 1655 indicates that by that time the Oostereiland existed. After further dredging in 1667 in the Oosterhaven and the Grashaven (between Oostereiland and Visserseiland), the land was raised by about 70 cm, and again in 1742.

A double-beam drawbridge between the Oostereiland and Achter op 't Zand (a street built on mud dredged from the harbors in 1648) was renovated in 1686; it is visible in a painting by Jan Claesz Rietschoof from 1708-11. It was replaced by a single drawbridge in 1711, and that one again in 1764. In 1889 a fixed bridge was installed, which was renovated in 1976, and in 2010 it was scheduled for replacement. Bridges of various kinds existed between the Oostereiland and De Haai (the extension of the Visserseiland), but the last one was removed likely between 1812 and 1823, and never replaced. Quays on the island were originally made of wood; one section was covered with compressed seaweed. On the north side, by the warehouse of the Admiralty of the Noorderkwartier, a quay made of stone was constructed.

A tannery existed on the island by 1657 (the first attested building on the island), and another one was built after 1691. There were none mentioned on the island in a land registry from 1733, but there were a few later in the 18th and in the 19th century. The last tannery on the island was deconstructed in 1968, and put up at the Zuiderzee Museum in Enkhuizen. Two trywork for boiling whale blubber existed on the island before 1660; they were torn down in the 18th century. Another was on De Haai, now part of the Visserseiland, and was built in 1662. A municipal requirement noted that no blubber was to be boiled on days that the wind blew into the city, given the enormous stench associated with the process. Between 1681 and 1739 the whaling industry in Hoorn practically disappeared, and afterward whalers who returned to Hoorn with their catch had the blubber boiled in Edam. The only tangible item remaining from the whaling industry is a whale vertebra, scored by an axe, that was fished out of the IJsselmeer in 1997.

The first major development was a set of warehouses for a merchant, Cornelis Jansz Schuijt (ca. 1620-1677). In 1658 or 1659, he had a U-shaped complex built, with warehouses on the north and west side, and two homes on the east side--the larger for him to live in, the shorter to rent out. The city was responsible for building a street around the complex. The aforementioned painting by Rietschoof shows the complex, and until the end of the 18th century the island was known as "Schuijtes Eyland". The buildings are still there, with only minor changes. In 1670, two merchants were given permission to operate a ferry between Hoorn and the French port cities of Rouen and Saint-Valery-en-Caux from next to the warehouses; the city again dredged the harbor and improved the quay for the ferries.

More large-scale development came courtesy of the Admiralty, which had shown interest in developing the island as a naval base and the Grashaven as its port. This did not come to fruition, but when in 1692 its warehouse on the Baadland burned down (to the east of the central Hoorn harbor), it bought the two homes and the warehouse on the west side, and in 1699 it also bought the warehouse on the north side. The Magazijn, as the complex was named, was a favorite topic for painters. During the "French period" the Magazijn may have been a military prison. The island's wharf was closed in 1817.

== Modern development ==
The complex of warehouses was turned into housing for the unhoused, and between 1829 and 2003 it served as a prison; by the 1980s it was a semi-open prison. In 2008, performance artist Chiara Fumai spent 31 days in a cell there as part of an art project. Between 1886 and 1932 it also served as an work center for prisoners and unemployed people; they sorted currants, which led to the complex being called the "Krententuin" ("currant yard").

The Oostereiland as well as the Visserseiland, on the other side of the Hoorn harbor, extensive city development was once planned but never executed. The island and its quays are municipal monuments; the prison buildings are a rijksmonument.

After renovation (and lengthy discussions over the future of the island and the role of the city in its development), the prison complex reopened in 2012, and now houses the Museum van de Twintigste Eeuw, a movie theater, offices, apparements, and a hotel. There are also historic vessels, part of the outdoor exhibit of the Westfries Museum. Between 2015 and 2020 it was the home port for the replica of the Halve Maen, the Dutch East India Company ship that was captained by Henry Hudson.
