= Mannahatta Project =

Wildlife Conservation Society New York City mapping project

The Mannahatta Project is a Wildlife Conservation Society research project in historical ecology that ran from 1999 to 2009, reconstructing the landscape of Manhattan Island as it would have existed in 1609 at the point of first contact between the Lenape people and the crew of the Dutch ship Halve Maen ("Half Moon"), captained by Henry Hudson. The effort culminated in the publication of Mannahatta: A Natural History of New York City in 2009, and led to a follow-on effort called the Welikia Project. It has also influenced other environmental initiatives.

== Project and book ==
The project, which was led by landscape ecologist Eric W. Sanderson, explored the great biodiversity and ecological complexity of Manhattan Island through a historical geographic information system based on georeferencing of the British Headquarters Map of 1782 and the Randel Farm Maps made for the Commissioners' Plan of 1811. It also detailed the formative impact of Native American use of fire in ecosystems.

The project culminated in 2009, marking the 400th anniversary of Henry Hudson's 1609 expedition, with the publication of a book called Mannahatta: A Natural History of New York City. The volume also includes a speculative look forward to the effect of climate change on New York City and hopeful human adaptations in the year 2409. An exhibition at the Museum of the City of New York was held the same year.

Sanderson estimates that in 1609 the landmass of the island now called Manhattan contained 66 miles of rivers and streams, numerous fishable tidal inlets, 70 kinds of trees, "627 species of plants, 85 species of fish, 32 species of reptiles and amphibians, 233 species of birds and 24 species of mammals." Additionally, Sanderson describes the 1609 landscape as one tended to by the Lenape people, with geological evidence suggesting that the indigenous people leveled forests and fields of grasslands, and possibly engaged in small scale farming.

== Later phase and influence ==
A follow-up project for 3 years was the Welikia Project ("my good home" in Lenape), examining the whole geography of New York City, which ran from 2010-2013. A planned sequel book is tentatively titled The Welikia Atlas: A Natural History of New York’s Five Boroughs.

The 2007 book The World Without Us includes a chapter "The City Without Us", inspired by the Mannahatta Project, that imagines a future depopulated New York City.

As a benchmark in environmental history, the Mannahatta Project has influenced restoration ecology initiatives in the region. The Billion Oyster Project aims to restore the estuary to its state in 1609.
