= NY400 =

2009 anniversary of Henry Hudson voyage

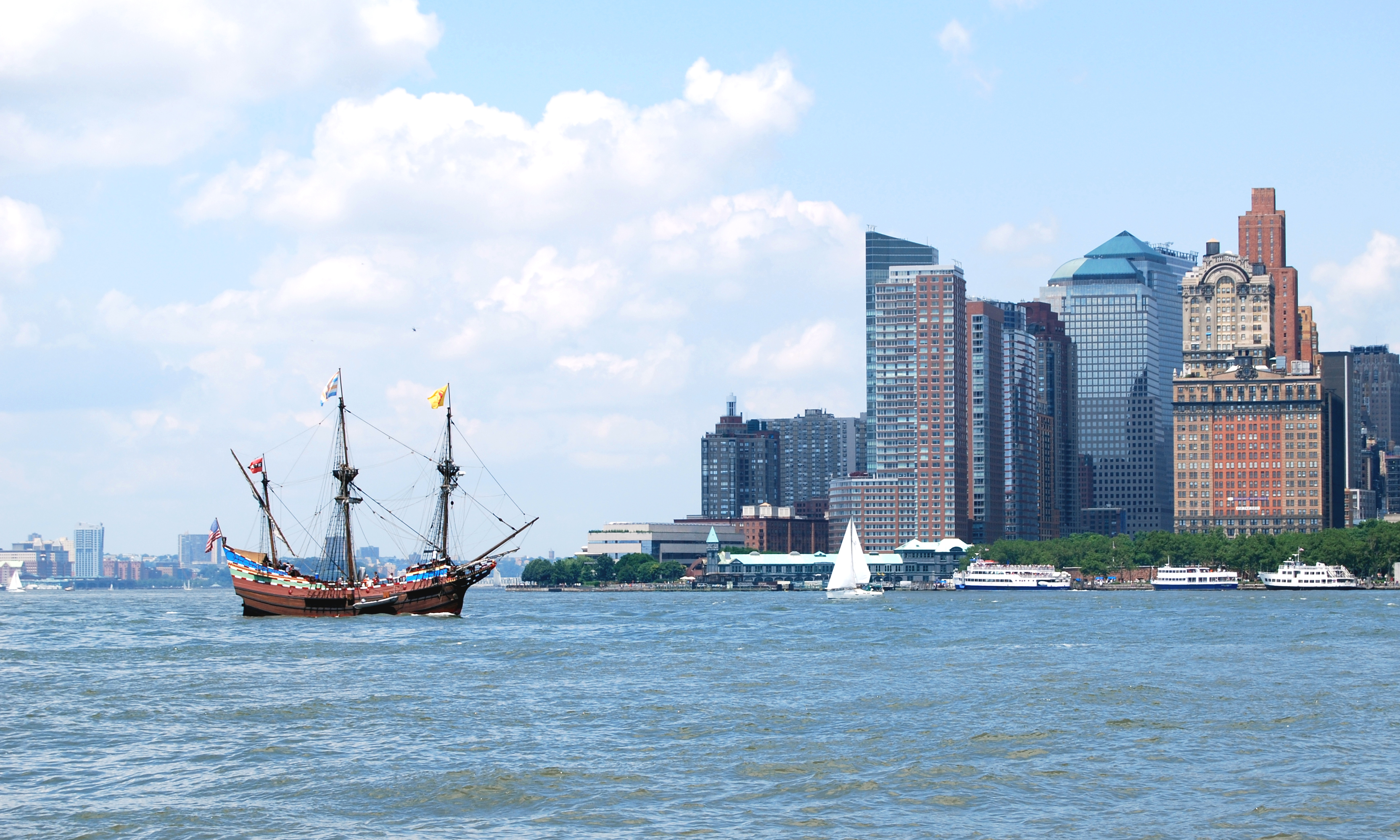
Replica of the Half Moon approaching Manhattan, June 2009.

NY400: Holland on the Hudson was the 2009 commemoration of the 400th anniversary of Henry Hudson's 1609 expedition up the river bearing his name, that later provided the basis for the founding of New Netherland. The 2009 commemoration was inspired by a Dutch-American Foundation, Henry Hudson 400, that organized a chain of events in the Netherlands and New York during 2009. The peak of activity in New York City was NY400 Week, September 8-13. It was also the occasion for environmental thinking, including the Mannahatta Project reconstructing the ecology of 1609 Manhattan.

Sponsored by the Embassy of the Netherlands and NYC & Company, the event was also known as the Hudson-Fulton-Champlain Quadricentennial in New York State, also commemorating the achievements of Robert Fulton and Samuel de Champlain, after the Hudson–Fulton Celebration a century previous. Design for the campaign was by a collaboration between two artists, the Swiss Cornelia Blatter and the Dutch Marcel Hermans.

Visits to New York City were made by a replica of the Half Moon and another of the Onrust, as well as Vermeer's The Milkmaid at the Metropolitan Museum of Art. The New Island Festival on Governors Island included the Goverthing art installation. Museum exhibitions were also held at the Museum of the City of New York, the Hudson River Museum and the Westchester Arts Council. The event's architectural legacy includes the New Amsterdam Plein and Pavilion at Peter Minuit Plaza at the southern tip of Manhattan, and the Walkway over the Hudson as a pedestrianized former railroad bridge at Poughkeepsie.
