= Wright Brothers flights of 1909 =

Series of flight demonstrations in New York City

Wilbur Wright circles the Statue of Liberty, September 29, 1909. The airplane is flying to the left.

Airplane inventors Wilbur and Orville Wright are famed for making the first controlled, powered, heavier-than-air flights on 17 December 1903 at Kitty Hawk, North Carolina. Lesser-known are other flights of theirs which played an important role at the dawn of aviation history. In 1909 Wilbur was invited by the Hudson-Fulton Celebration Committee to make paid exhibition flights to help mark 300 years of New York history, including Henry Hudson discovering Manhattan and Robert Fulton starting a successful commercial steamboat service on the Hudson River. The committee wanted the Wrights to demonstrate flights over the water around New York City. Orville was making flights for customers in Germany, so Wilbur, who had just finished training U.S. Army pilots, accepted the job.

== The flights ==
Another acclaimed aviator, Glenn Curtiss, had agreed to participate. Curtiss had recently set the world airspeed record in France, and the Wrights had just filed suit against him for patent infringement of their control systems. The public's anticipation was fueled by news of the patent disputes. These flights would be a showdown between the two fliers.

They were both scheduled to make a series of flights from Governors Island in New York harbor. On September 29, Wilbur took off at 9:15 AM in windy conditions. Curtiss felt his airplane could not handle the winds and he declined to fly. When Curtiss admitted defeat to the wind, Wilbur is supposed to have said to him, 'It looks pretty good. I think I will take a little spin in a few minutes.' He flew for about two miles, which took a little longer than seven minutes.

Later that day Wilbur took off again, at 10:18 AM. He flew over the ocean liner Lusitania and a flotilla of other watercraft on hand for the Hudson-Fulton celebration, many blowing their horns and tooting their whistles when the Flyer appeared overhead. As Wilbur flew toward the Statue of Liberty, many onlookers feared he would crash into it, but he skillfully circled the statue as planned. This flight caused a sensation in the press and became an iconic event, despite lasting less than five minutes.

Still unable to fly in the gusty weather, Curtiss had to depart for St. Louis due to a prior agreement. He was supposed to have flown up the Hudson River for several miles and returned to Governors Island.

Wilbur knew that if the engine failed and he had to set down, his skids would bite into the water, throwing him forward into the wires crisscrossing between the forward struts and possibly injuring him. As the wood-and-cloth wings would begin to settle and sink under the weight of the engine, they could drag him down before he could disentangle himself. So when Wilbur arrived on Governors Island, south of Manhattan, on the morning of September 29, he and Charlie Taylor, his mechanic, had made a strange modification to the Flyer: Beneath the lower wing, they had slung a bright red canoe, which Wilbur had purchased a few days earlier from the H&D Folsom Arms Company. A top-of-the-line Indian Girl canoe made by the Rushton Canoe Company, it featured a sturdy 16-foot frame made of northern white cedar, which Rushton claimed was nearly a third lighter than other cedars.

The canoe’s light weight (approximately 60 pounds) and sturdy construction attracted mostly Adirondack hunters and anglers used to portaging around rapids and waterfalls. Wright was drawn not only by these features but also by the canoe’s aerodynamic shape. To reduce drag, Wilbur had removed the Flyer’s second passenger seatback, and for waterproofing had tightly sealed the open canoe top with nailed-down canvas. In essence, the canoe turned the Flyer into the world’s first floatplane. Wilbur hoped that in the event the engine failed and the airplane ended up in the water, the canoe would keep the aircraft afloat. With luck, as the airplane glided into the water, the canoe might even hold the craft upright. As the airplane floated, the pilot would have time to extricate himself and swim away. The addition of a life vest next to him, which he could don before swimming clear, suggests that Wilbur had characteristically thought the matter through and come up with a contingency plan.

A blown engine cylinder that afternoon prevented any more flights. This series of flights marked Wilbur's last flying before a public audience.

"It was an interesting trip, and at times rather exciting."

— Wilbur Wright, in a letter to his father Milton Wright

On Monday, October 4, Wilbur took off at 9:53 AM. He flew north over the Hudson along the west shore of Manhattan, passing Grant's Tomb, then returned by the same route, finishing the 21 mile, 33-minute flight with a safe landing on Governor's Island. As many as a million people witnessed the flight. This was the exact flight that Curtiss had been unable to make. Before the flight, Wilbur attached a red canoe to the bottom of the airplane as a safety precaution in case of an emergency landing in the water. After Wilbur's death in 1912, Orville put the canoe in Hawthorn Hill, his estate in Oakwood, Ohio, as a memento. This first airborne canoe was later moved to Carillon Historical Park in Ohio and exhibited in a room adjacent to the Wright Flyer III in Wright Hall.

The flight around the Statue of Liberty was duplicated on May 26, 2003 by the Dayton 'Wright B Flyer, Inc.' group, with a replica of the Wright airplane as a part of the celebrations of the anniversary of the Wright brothers' first flight.
