= W Architecture & Landscape Architecture =

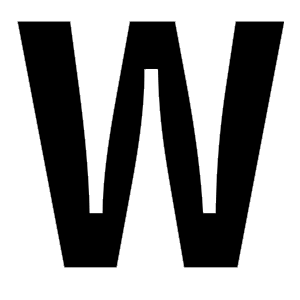
- Type: Private
- Industry: Architecture, Landscape Architecture, Urban Design
- Founded: 1999
- Headquarters: Brooklyn, New York City
- Area served: Worldwide
- Key people: Barbara E. Wilks (Founder)
- Website: w-architecture.com

W Architecture & Landscape Architecture (W Architecture) is an international architecture and landscape architecture firm based in Brooklyn, New York City. Founded in 1999 by Barbara E. Wilks, the firm is primarily known for its design of major waterfront reclamation projects and collaborative repurposing of public spaces. W Architecture has received substantial coverage in the media for the Edge Park in Williamsburg, Brooklyn; a redesign of the West Harlem waterfront; restoration of St. Patrick's Island in Calgary; and the recent Plaza 33 Madison Square Garden adjacency.

== History ==
W Architecture & Landscape Architecture was formed as a Limited Liability Corporation in 1999 by Barbara E. Wilks, who remains founder and principal of the firm. Wilks, a fellow in both the American Institute of Architects (FAIA) and the American Society of Landscape Architects (FASLA), claims to have started the company "to create a design-oriented, multidisciplinary practice focused on urban issues," and to "realign nature and the city. In recent years, W Architecture's projects have increasingly moved toward larger collaborations spanning multiple municipal agencies such as NYCEDC and other neighborhood revitalization organizations or economic development councils.

== Philosophy ==
In the 2015 Now Urbanism: The Future City is Here W Architecture is described as being part of a "new kind of urban activism and urban design," willing to "stimulate social action for sustainable urban design and therefore cooler cities." The firm's site plans display a preference for the reintroduction of natural ecological systems rather than ad hoc botanical features. The designs tend to emphasize the resiliency of local flora previously displaced by manmade, commercial manipulation of municipal waterways. Consistent characteristics throughout the firm's portfolio are the utilization of reclaimed local materials, streets and walks that turn into greenways, sloped planes, as well as long angular overlays and subtle dimensional transitioning to introduce water, botanical, and recreational features. Not all the firm's projects are waterfront revitalizations, however, Wilks said, speaking at the 2013 reSITE conference in Prague, she enjoys this kind of work because it's "where natural systems come together with manmade, human systems."

Wilks has also integrated a research component into the firm's projects regarding the advantages of bringing back wetland areas to the New York City coastline. She has advocated for the reintroduction of these areas as a means to buffer storm surge, especially after damages caused by Hurricane Sandy, and to increase access to waterfront areas for people and animals.

== Notable Projects ==
=== The Edge Park in Williamsburg ===
New zoning laws passed in accordance with Bloomberg's claiming of the river as "the sixth borough" opened the way for multiple waterfront parks in New York City, such as The Edge Park in Williamsburg, Brooklyn. Anticipating an increase in density and need for waterfront access, the park was deemed a mixed-use site along the East River and completed in March 2011. According to Wilks, the park allows "the city grid and the river's ecosystem to converge, mingle, and clash..." To this end, W Architecture utilized several of its signature elements, including: a street that becomes a pedestrian greenway; deep pier structures that make the area seem more like land than traditional piers; a garage area covered by a sloping lawn; and stone that allows for rising and falling waterlines.

=== St. Patrick's Island ===
A restoration of the previously existing island park in the Bow River between the East Village and Bridgeland, in Calgary, Alberta, St. Patrick's Island was a collaborative project by W Architecture and Denver-based Civitas. Though already established as a park in the late 19th century, the island had been degrading and was seen by the city as an underused area that had fallen into disrepair. In 2010 Calgary Municipal Land Corporation began an effort to re-establish the park to its current usable area of 31 hectares. Completed in July 2015, the park now features a number of elements that have both made it more usable to the public and have restored its channels and biodiversity. Features include: a "seasonal breach" for wading onto a gravel bar; a sloped grassy knoll which serves as s viewing area for movies, performances, and sledding in the winter; a riparian wetland with a boardwalk across it; an amphitheater and water features; and a 23-meter sculpture entitled "Bloom."

=== West Harlem Piers Park ===
As a major early component of a larger waterfront master plan undertaken for West Harlem, West Harlem Piers Park was completed in the Fall of 2008. The result of efforts by 40 neighborhood groups and coalitions, the park linked the coastline between Riverside Park and Riverbank State Park. As master planners for the project, W Architecture converted a narrow strip of land, essentially a 69,000 sq. ft. parking lot that cut off the community of West Harlem from the waterfront, into a 105,526 sq. ft. park. It features granite benches, sloped lawn areas, repurposed cobblestone in paved areas, and various water access features for kayaking, fishing, and general recreation. As a result of the design, a substantial increase in land permeability was achieved and accommodations for fluctuating runoff and storm surges have allowed the park to sustain dramatic weather events since its completion.

== Portfolio ==
- Tide Point
- Plaza 33
- St. Petersburg Pier Approach
- The Bentalou Library
- Troy Riverfront Park
- Cornell University College of Human Ecology
- Doma Gallery
- King Abdullah Financial District
- Sheikh Rashid Bin Saeed Crossing
- Tyson's Corner Master Plan
- USS Constellation
- Villahermosa

== Awards ==
=== St. Patrick’s Island ===
- 2016 National Urban Design Awards; St. Patrick’s Island
- Urban Design Catalyst Calgary 2016; Mayor’s Award; St. Patrick’s Island
- Canadian Society of Landscape Architects 2015; Regional Merit Award; St. Patrick’s Island
- ASLA Denver 2015 Honor Award; St. Patrick’s Island
- AIA NY 2014 Design Award; St. Patrick’s Island

=== West Harlem Piers Park ===
- AIA 2005 National Honor Award for Regional and Urban Design
- Beverly Willis Foundation 2015 Built by Women NYC Award; West Harlem Piers Park
- MASterworks Awards 2010; Neighborhood Catalyst, West Harlem Piers Park
- ASLA NY 2009 Honor Award; West Harlem Piers Park
- The Waterfront Center 2009; Honor Award; West Harlem Piers Park

=== The Edge Park ===
- ASLA NY 2012 Merit Award; The Edge Park

=== Plaza 33 ===
- ASLA-NY 2016 Design Awards; Plaza 33
- AIA NY 2016 Design Award; Plaza 33
- AIA NYS 2016 Honor Award
- ASLA NY 2016 Honor Award

=== DoMa Gallery ===
- AIA 2004 National Honor Award
- AIA NYS 2003 Award of Excellence

=== Cornell University, Human Ecology Building ===
- AIA NY 2012 Merit Award; Cornell University, Human Ecology Building

=== Tide Point ===
- ASLA 2003 National Design Merit Award

== Sources ==
- Wilks, Barbara, Eric Sanderson, and Michael Sorkin (2013). Structuring Confluence: The Work of W Architecture & Landscape Architecture. ORO Editions. ISBN 9781941806128
