= Eric W. Sanderson =

American landscape ecologist

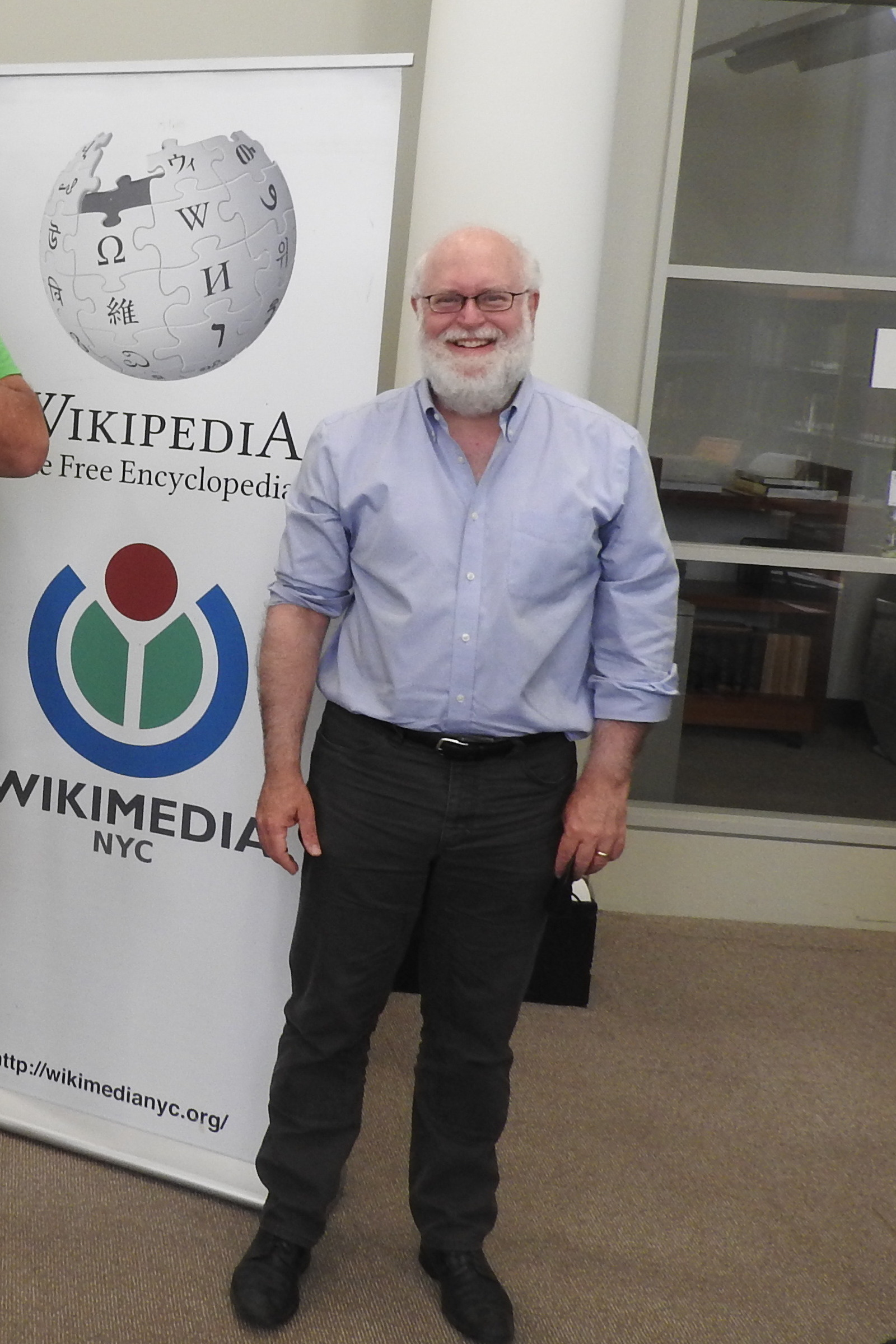
Sanderson in 2022

Eric W. Sanderson, a landscape ecologist and Vice President for Urban Conservation Strategy at the New York Botanical Garden in the Bronx, director of the Mannahatta Project and the author of Mannahatta: A Natural History of New York City. In 2013 Sanderson's book Terra Nova: The New World After Oil, Cars, and Suburbs was published.

Sanderson earned his B.A.S. and Ph.D. in ecology from the University of California, Davis. He was Senior Conservation Ecologist at the Wildlife Conservation Society (WCS) where he worked from 1998 to 2023 when he joined the New York Botanical Garden. As part of his work at WCS, Sanderson was the chief author, researcher, and director of the Mannahatta Project.

== Publications ==
- Sanderson, Eric W. and Markley Boyer (Illustrator) (2009). Mannahatta: A Natural History of New York City Abrams Books. ISBN 0810996332
- Wilks, Barbara, Eric W. Sanderson, and Michael Sorkin (2013). Structuring Confluence: The Work of W Architecture & Landscape Architecture. ORO Editions. ISBN 9781941806128
- Eric W. Sanderson (2026), Before New York The Natural Geography of the City: An Atlas and Gazetteer. Abrams. ISBN 9781419760051
