= Hudson–Fulton Celebration =

Anniversary of the discovery of the Hudson River

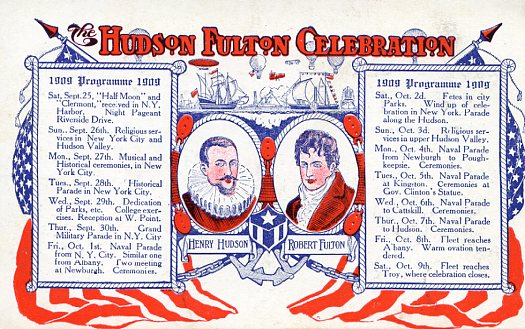
Hudson–Fulton Celebration program

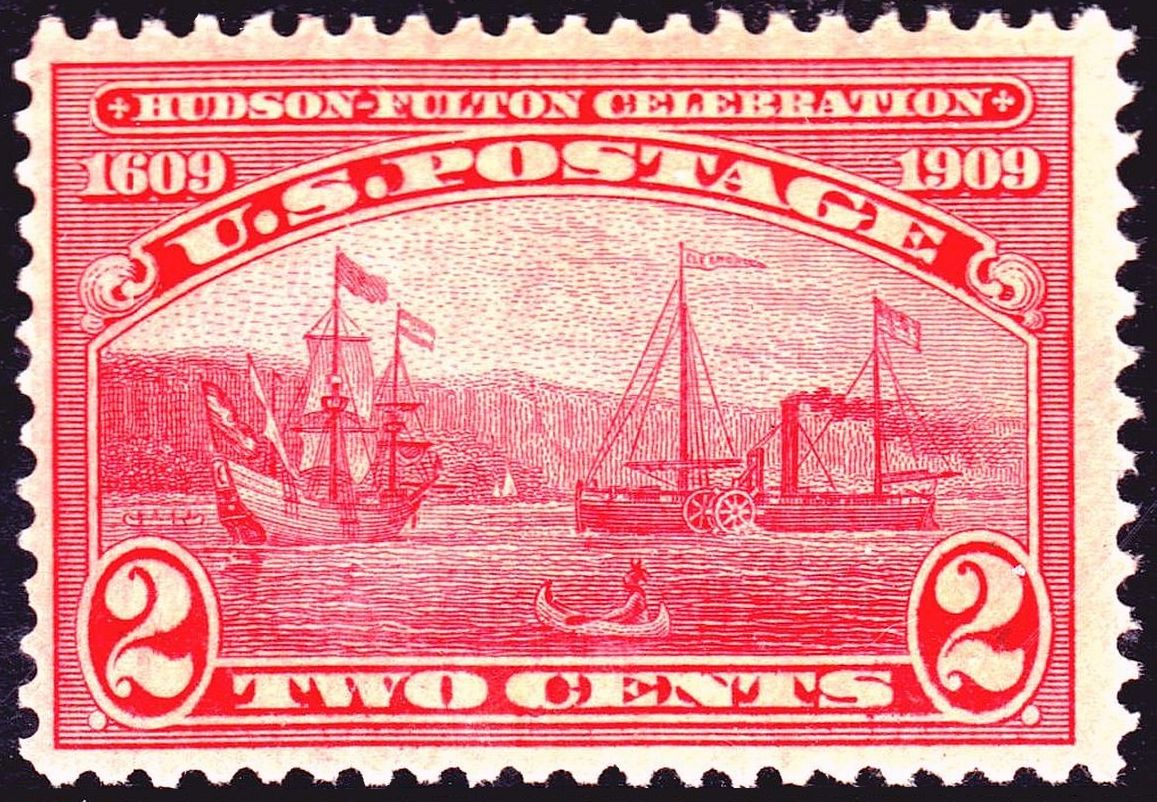
Hudson–Fulton Celebration New York City, commemorative stamp, 1909 Issue

The Hudson–Fulton Celebration from September 25 to October 9, 1909 in New York and New Jersey was an elaborate commemoration of the 300th anniversary of Henry Hudson’s discovery of the Hudson River and the 100th anniversary of Robert Fulton's first successful commercial application of the paddle steamer. The maritime achievements of Hudson and Fulton foreshadowed the importance of the river to New York's progress and identity. Organizers used the event not only to display the success of the two men, but also the status of New York City as a world city and the achievements of its citizens.

== The commission ==
The Celebration was created and organized by the Celebration Commission, consisting of a large group of wealthy and influential New Yorkers, such as J. P. Morgan, Andrew Carnegie, and others. The commission, over the course of its long planning period (from 1905 to 1909), established dozens of committees to oversee every detail of the event, from the Celebration's official symbols to the role of New York's children.

== New light ==
Electricity played a major role in the celebration, as ships and memorials were illuminated over the course of the two-week celebration. The illumination of the naval fleet on September 25 was followed by a display of fireworks in the evening that reflected off the Hudson River. These fireworks were shot over the naval fleet from the Jersey Shore, so that they could be seen from Riverside Park. The Committee commissioned one company to regulate the fireworks; this would not only ensure a uniform display across the State but also, because the company could set off the fireworks in rapid succession, invoke historic memory of the signal fires that Hudson used to navigate along the coast.

The Commission allocated $83,000 from its budget of $934,447 for a total of 107,152 illuminations, including various types of lights and fireworks, installed for the celebration; in addition to the town halls and bridges, these lights also illuminated the Statue of Liberty, Grant's Tomb, Soldiers' and Sailors' Monument, the Washington Arch, and some museums, like the Brooklyn Institute of Arts and Sciences. A diversity of light was used to electrify the city. For the Celebration alone, 500,000 incandescent light bulbs were installed, in addition to the other 500,000 incandescent lights already in use around the state. 3,000 Flare arcs and 7,000 arc lights were used, as well, in addition to searchlights, which lit Grant's Tomb and the Statue of Liberty. Washington Arch and its surrounding streets were festooned with lights.

== Parades ==
The historical and carnival parades took place between September 25 and October 9, 1909. The historical parade provided a visual education to the city's diverse population and visitors, and the carnival parades conveyed the city's culture. The planning and design of the parades began two years prior with float designs developed by New Orleans-based artist Bror Anders Wikström and direction from A. H. Stoddard, who was captain of the Rex Mardis Gras krewe's parades.

The parade consisted of fifty-four floats divided into four divisions, which constituted the "periods" of New York history up to 1909—the Indian Period, the Dutch Period, the English or Colonial Period, and the American or United States Period, also referred to as the Modern Period. An enormous float preceded all four divisions—this was the title car for the event as a whole. This massive introduction to the parade's theme depicted "The History of the Empire State", and included, among other things, a canoe and a steamboat, a wigwam and a skyscraper, and the Statue of Liberty.

The Carnival Parade was held later in the week, on the evening of October 2, 1909. It traversed the same route as the Historical Parade. The Carnival Pageant illustrated the great body of Old World folklore that has inspired so much of the beautiful imagery of the poetry, song and drama of all civilized nations. Unlike its sister event, the historical parade, the carnival parade was not divided up into divisions. It did, however, have a grand title car – a dragon spouting flames and carrying a scroll bearing the theme of the parade – "Music, Literature, and Art". The following forty-nine floats proceeded to illustrate what was suggested in the title. There were several straight allegorical floats, portraying "colors", "peace", and "song", and depicting scenes like "The Crowning of Beethoven", a float upon which a bust of the composer was crowned by "Fame", and surrounded by dancing "Muses". But the themes were also represented through mythology. Floats illustrated tales from the Bible, a Queen of Sheba float; from German folklore, floats of Lorelei, the Death of Fafner, and so on; from classical mythology, floats of Medusa and Diana; from fairytales, a fairies float and a Cinderella float; from Egyptian customs, and so on. The culture represented was extensive. The final float of the Carnival Parade brought the focus back to America, with a representation of "Uncle Sam Welcoming the Nations", displaying the hospitality and peaceful desires of the United States.

Both the historical and carnival parades were met with decent success. New Yorkers’ evident enjoyment of the spectacle indicates that the Celebration Commission did its job well. Its messages of continuity, progress, and grandeur were present along with the floats, but it is difficult to evaluate the popular response to these intended lessons. Regardless of whether they understood the commission's messages, the audience enjoyed both parades. The crowd itself, delighting in its city, may in fact have been the more important spectacle in New York's history than the massive floats that depicted it.

== Sailing sea and sky ==
One way the memories of Hudson and Fulton were honored was in the replication of Hudson's Half Moon and Fulton's Clermont, the sailboat and steamship each respectively navigated on the river. Both vessels were newly replicated, displayed, and dedicated with great fanfare, and were included in the Celebration's grand naval parade of American and foreign warships, which emphasized the United States’ naval supremacy in the Western Hemisphere. Additionally, the Celebration's military parade on Manhattan Island showcased American national identity and pride while simultaneously promoting international peace. The celebration also was a display of the different modes of transportation then in existence. The ocean liner RMS Lusitania represented the newest advancement in steamship technology at the time and was likewise put on display in 1909, only six years before it was sunk by German U-boat U-20 in 1915.

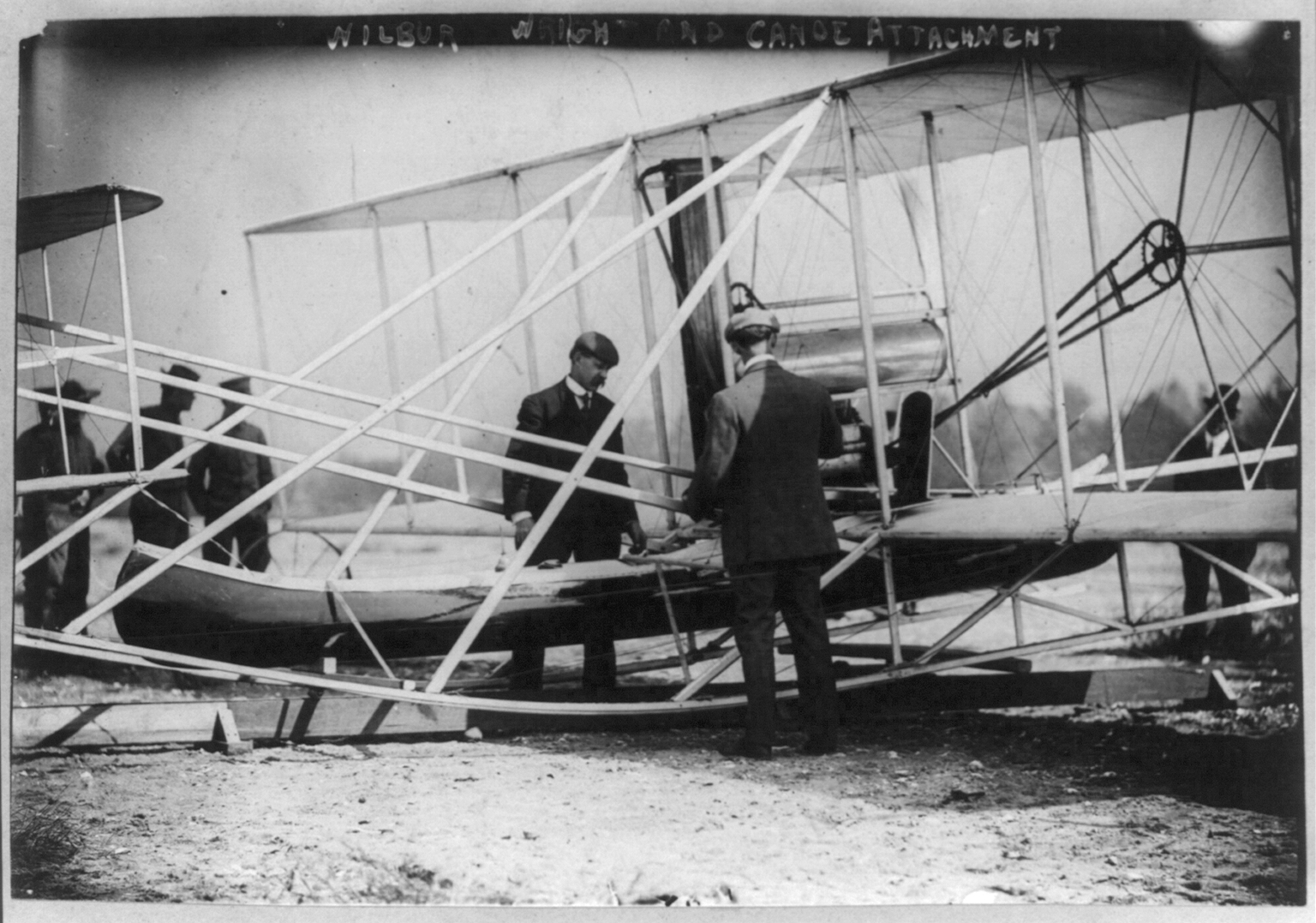
Wilbur Wright (back to camera) and mechanic Charlie Taylor fix a canoe to the Wright A Flyer used during the Celebration.

The Celebration also included public flights by Wilbur Wright, who had won world fame with demonstration flights in Europe in late 1908 and spring 1909. Using Governor's Island as an airfield, on September 29 he flew around the Statue of Liberty. On October 4 he made a 33-minute flight over the Hudson River to Grant's Tomb and back, enabling perhaps a million New Yorkers to see their first airplane flight. Glenn Curtiss also appeared, but made only very brief flights, preferring not to challenge the windy conditions.

== City history ==
Although Hudson, Fulton, and their achievements were the foundation of the Celebration, the commission also aimed to emphasize the history of New York City and State, from the Native American communities to the metropolitan city of 1909. This narrative was illustrated by the Celebration's Historical Parade, which depicted four periods of New York history: the Native American Period, the Dutch Period, the English or Colonial Period, and the American or Modern Period. The Dutch portion of the parade was particularly significant to the Celebration because Dutch contributions to New York history were particularly revered at the time, inspired by a revisionist history movement known as "Holland Mania" sweeping the country, drawing on the writings of John Lothrop Motley. This was made manifest in New York by the creation of the Holland Society of New York, an exclusive club aiming to underscore the Dutch presence in New York, from Dutch values such as religious tolerance to the importance of education. Education remained important in 1909, and was a distinct aspect of the Celebration Commission's goals for the event. The Historical Parade, for example, was a way for the commission to teach the diverse population demographics of New York City—many of whom were recent immigrants – about the history of both the United States and the city in which they now lived. Now more than ever, the children of immigrant families were particularly sought out by the public school system; Progressive reformers considered the education of children, especially the children of immigrants, paramount, because they were seen as the future of New York. The children of New York had a specialized role in the Hudson–Fulton Celebration. Hundreds of thousands participated in a Children's Festival, which embraced all nationalities and classes. Even children from marginalized groups like African Americans were allowed to participate. The Children's Festival employed dances, patriotic displays, and history lessons, which mirrored the civic lessons taught in Lower East Side settlement houses.

== Reform ==
The Hudson–Fulton Celebration of 1909 was linked to several reform movements sweeping New York City, in addition to Progressivism. These included the Conservation and Preservation movements, which led to the creation of the Historical Preservation Society. This organization worked to restore and establish landmarks and parks; these goals would be seen in the Celebration, in the many dedications of monuments which occurred over the course of the festivities. These monuments promoted the history of the city, and provided, like the Historical Parade, a visual history lesson for New Yorkers. Similar to the Progressives’ City Beautiful Movement, these memorials hoped to develop a unified civic identity for the diverse inhabitants of New York City.

To express New York's civic identity and its emerging cultural preeminence, the Commission organized a Carnival Parade. Its floats displayed the music, art, and literature of the Old World, in an attempt to link New York to London, Paris, and other European metropolises. This event was a night celebration which illuminated New York, creating an exciting and festive atmosphere.

== Culture ==
The cultural refinement displayed in the Carnival Parade was an example of New York's status as a cosmopolis as displayed on the iconic Fifth Avenue. History and culture were present in the dozens of museum exhibitions designed specifically for the event to attract tourists from Europe and other parts of the United States. As the Carnival Parade's floats and marchers moved down Fifth Avenue, spectators looked on in awe. They memorialized their visit to New York with postcards from the Celebration, a hobby that consumed America and bolstered the importance and economic development of the America's postal service. The post office of New York, as well as the city's transportation system, were integral to the success of the 1909 Celebration, as they served to connect the vast American continent and spread awareness of both the event and the city. This momentous occasion was much more than the commemoration of Henry Hudson and Robert Fulton – it was also a recreation of New York's history, a promotion of the city's culture, a window into the social movements of the time, and an attempt to strengthen New York's national reputation and international status. The elaborate preparations of the commission were not in vain; this last great celebration in New York City was appreciated by millions in 1909, and is a success worth remembering today. A commemorative plate was produced by Royal Doulton China, The "Areo" Plate, which shows Wilbur Wright who flew up the Hudson River for the event, as well as other means of transportation including airships and boats in the river.

== Gallery ==
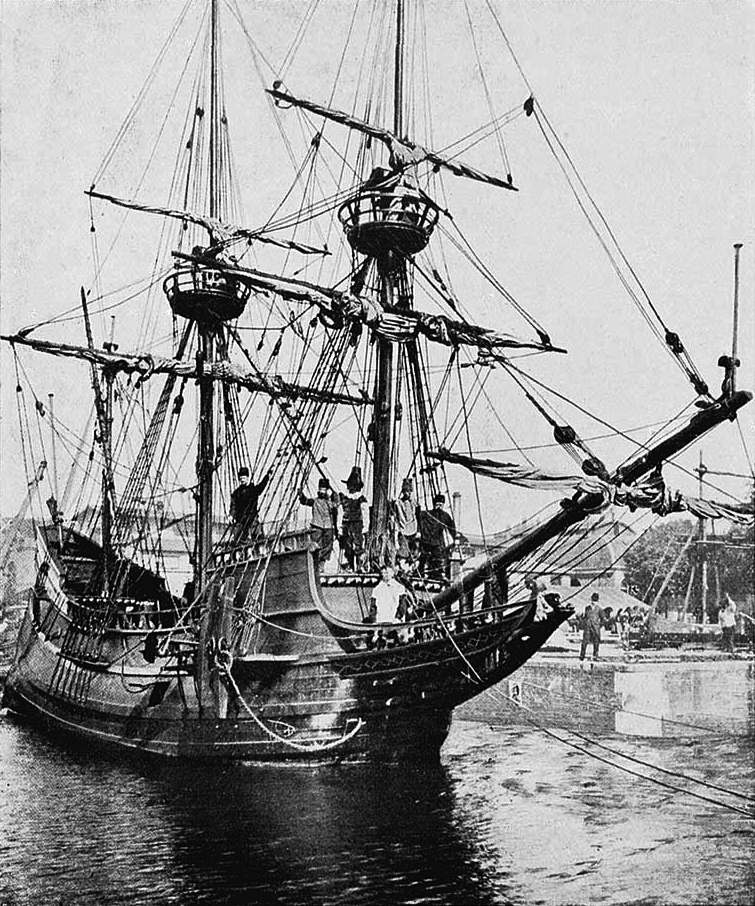
Halve Maen

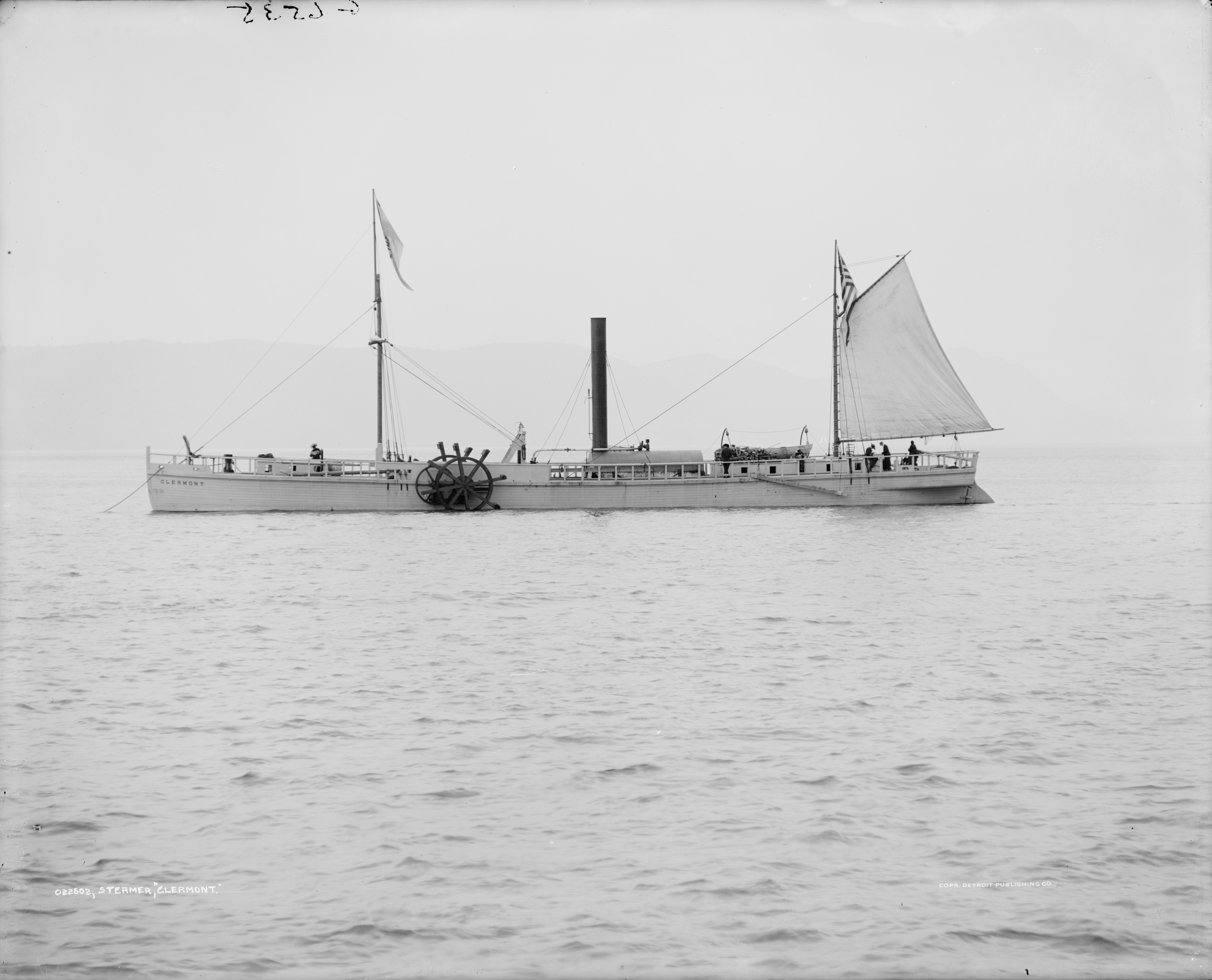
North River Steamboat

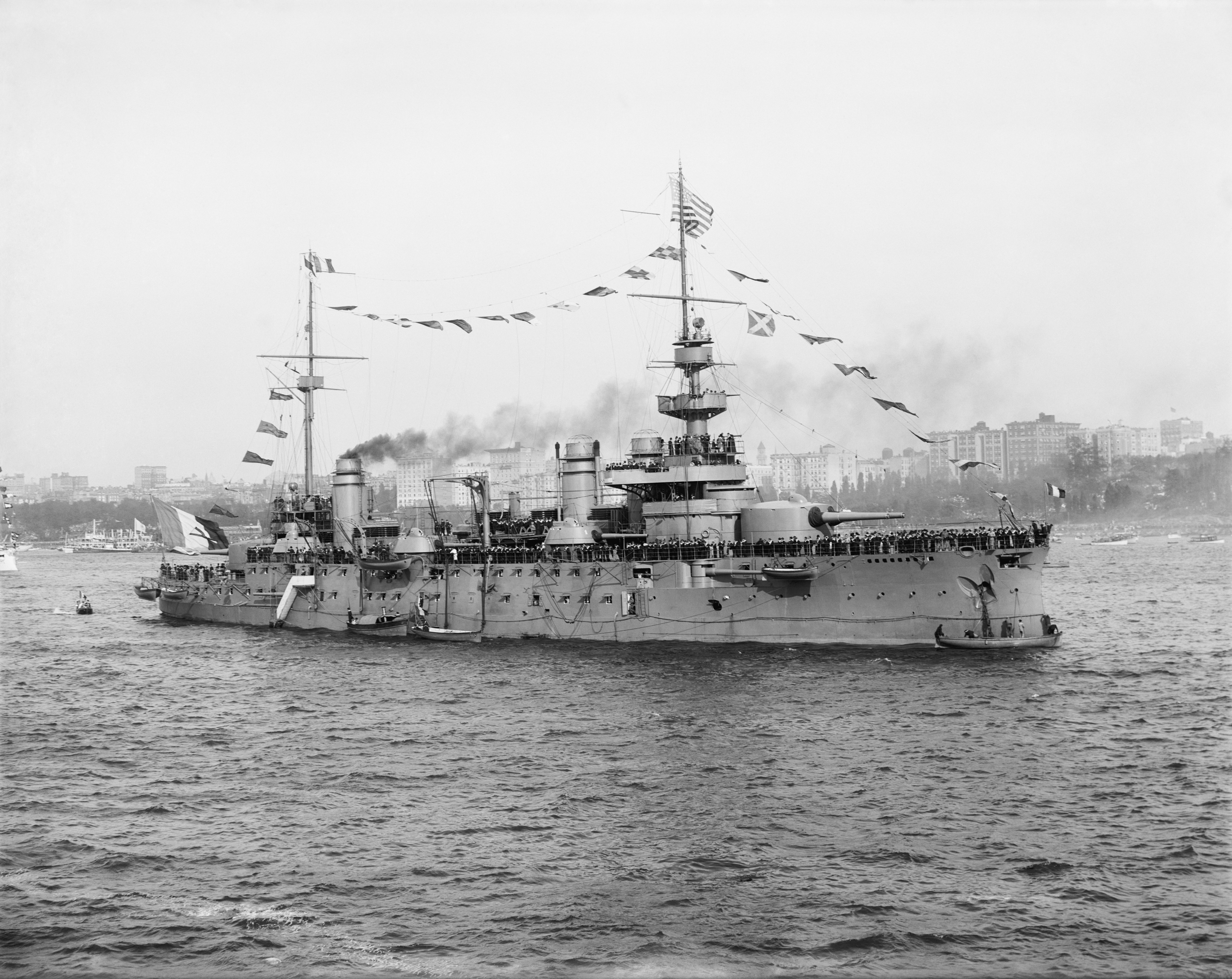
Justice

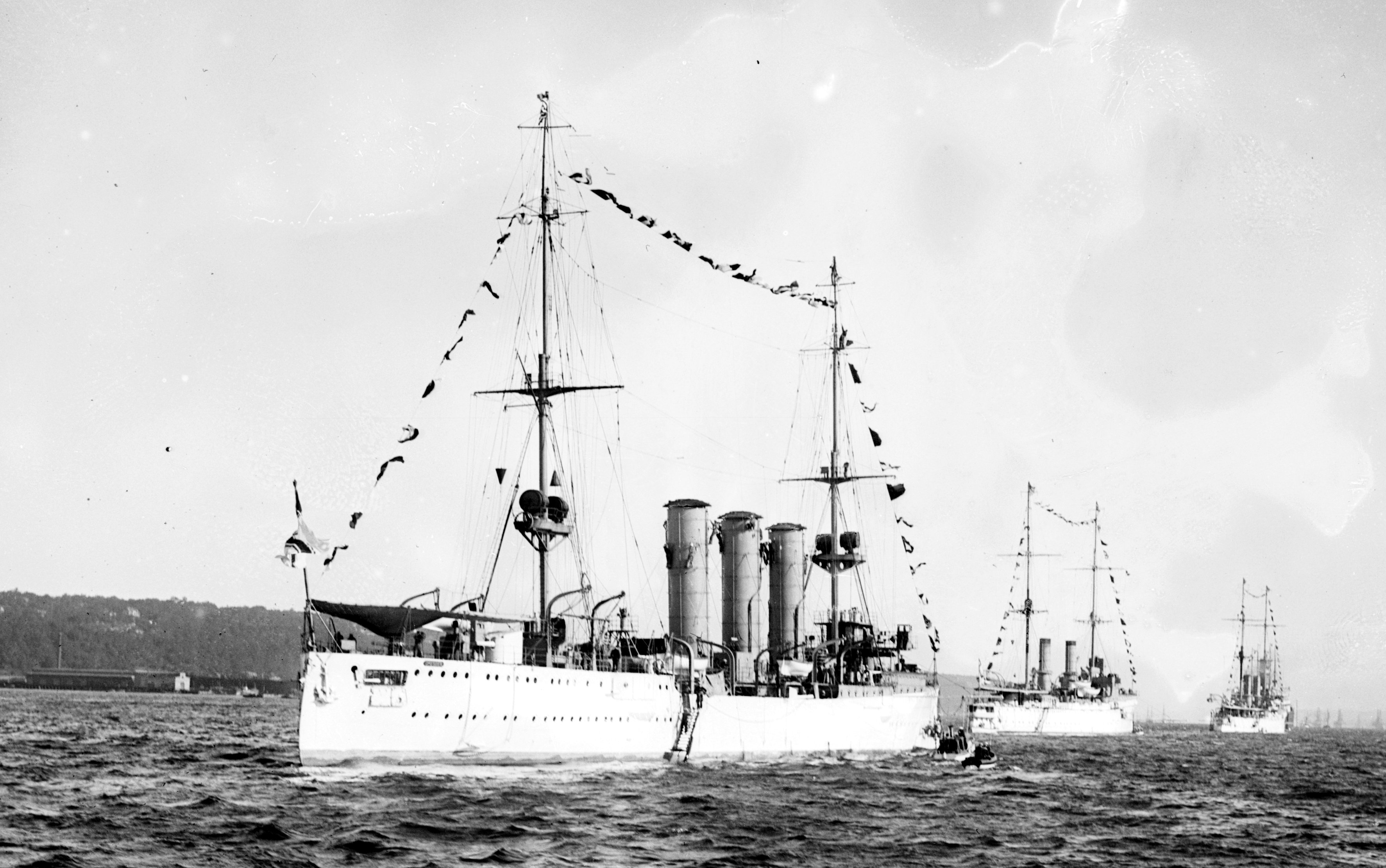
Dresden, Victoria Louise, and Hertha

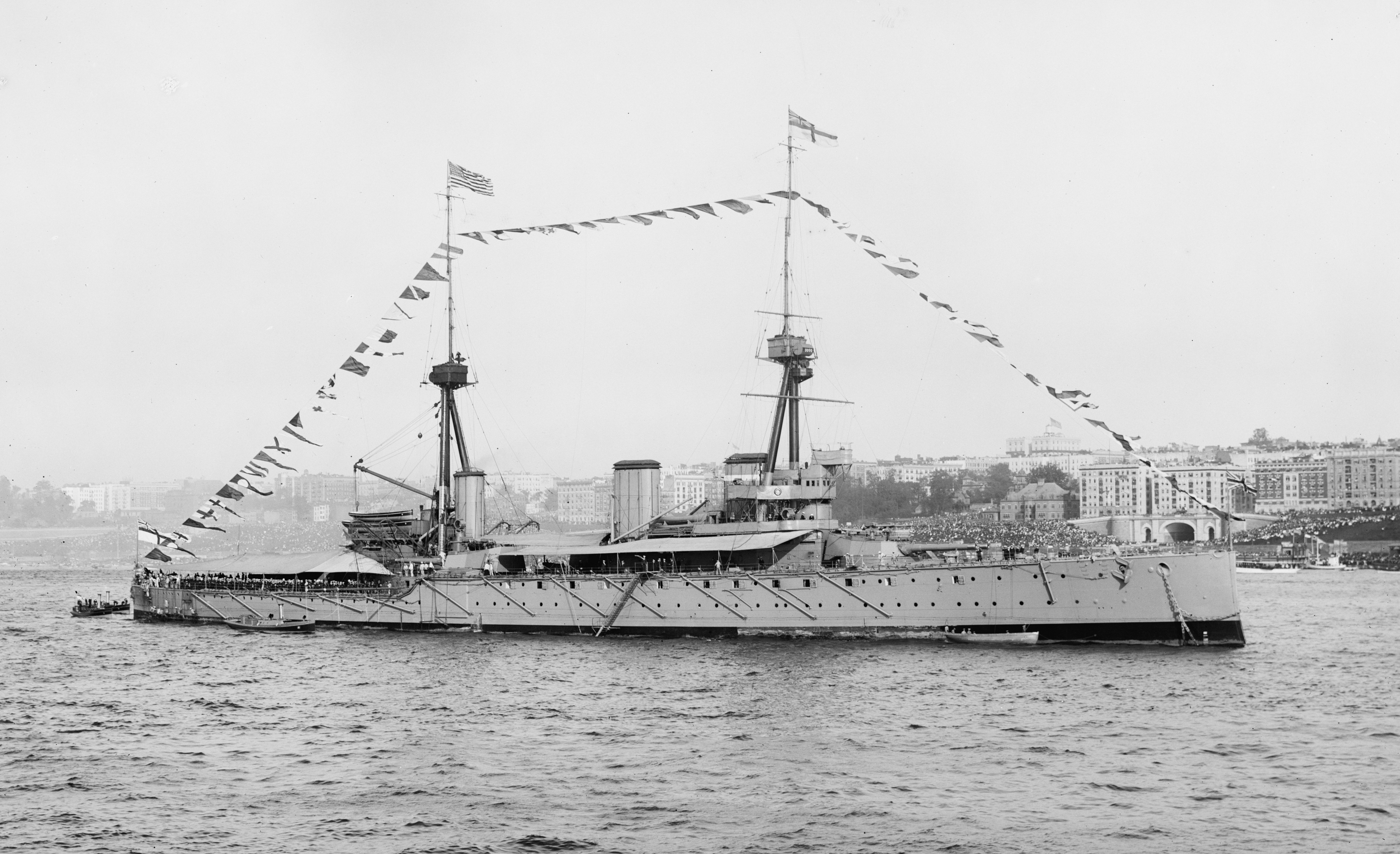
Inflexible

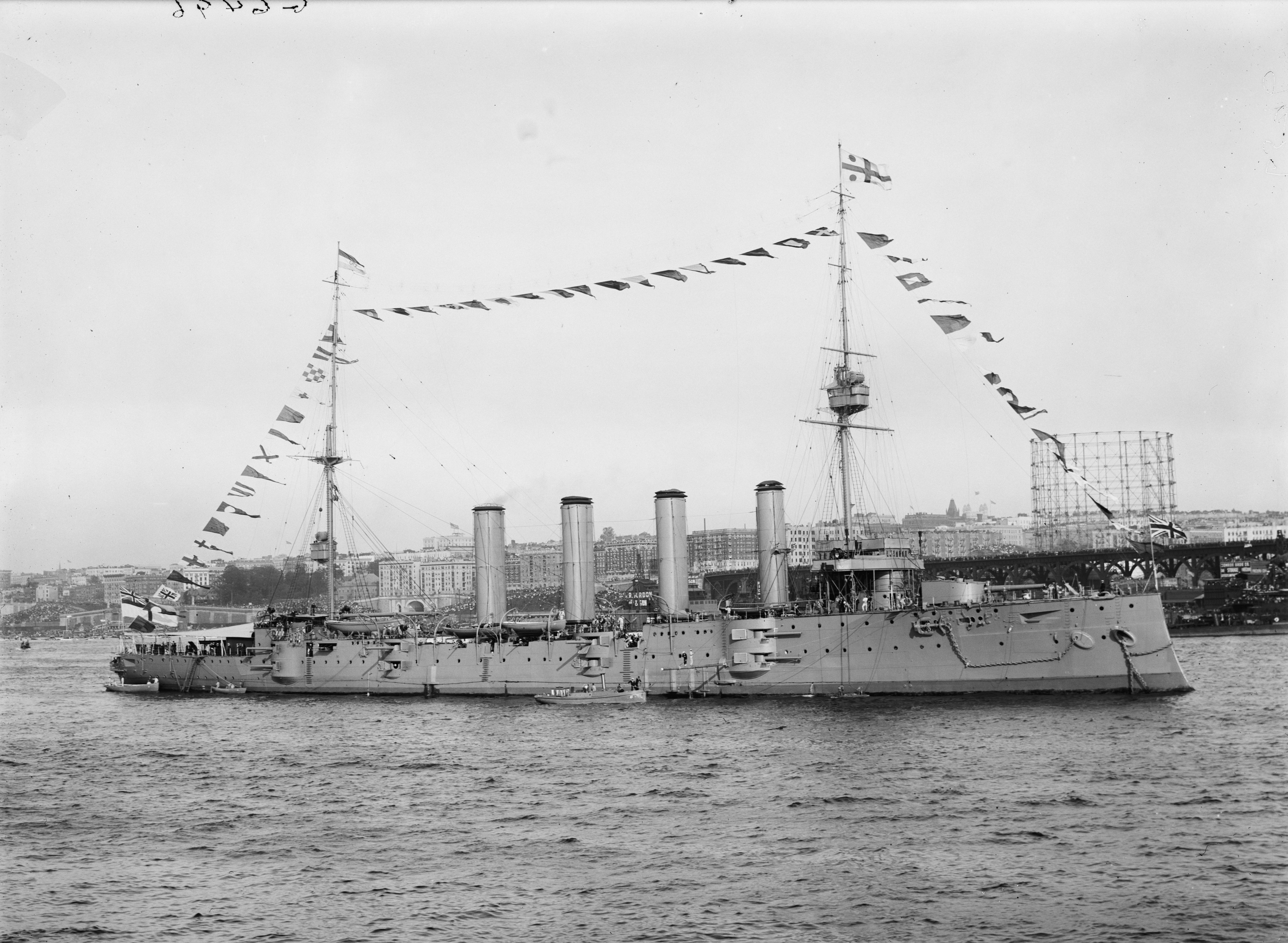
Drake

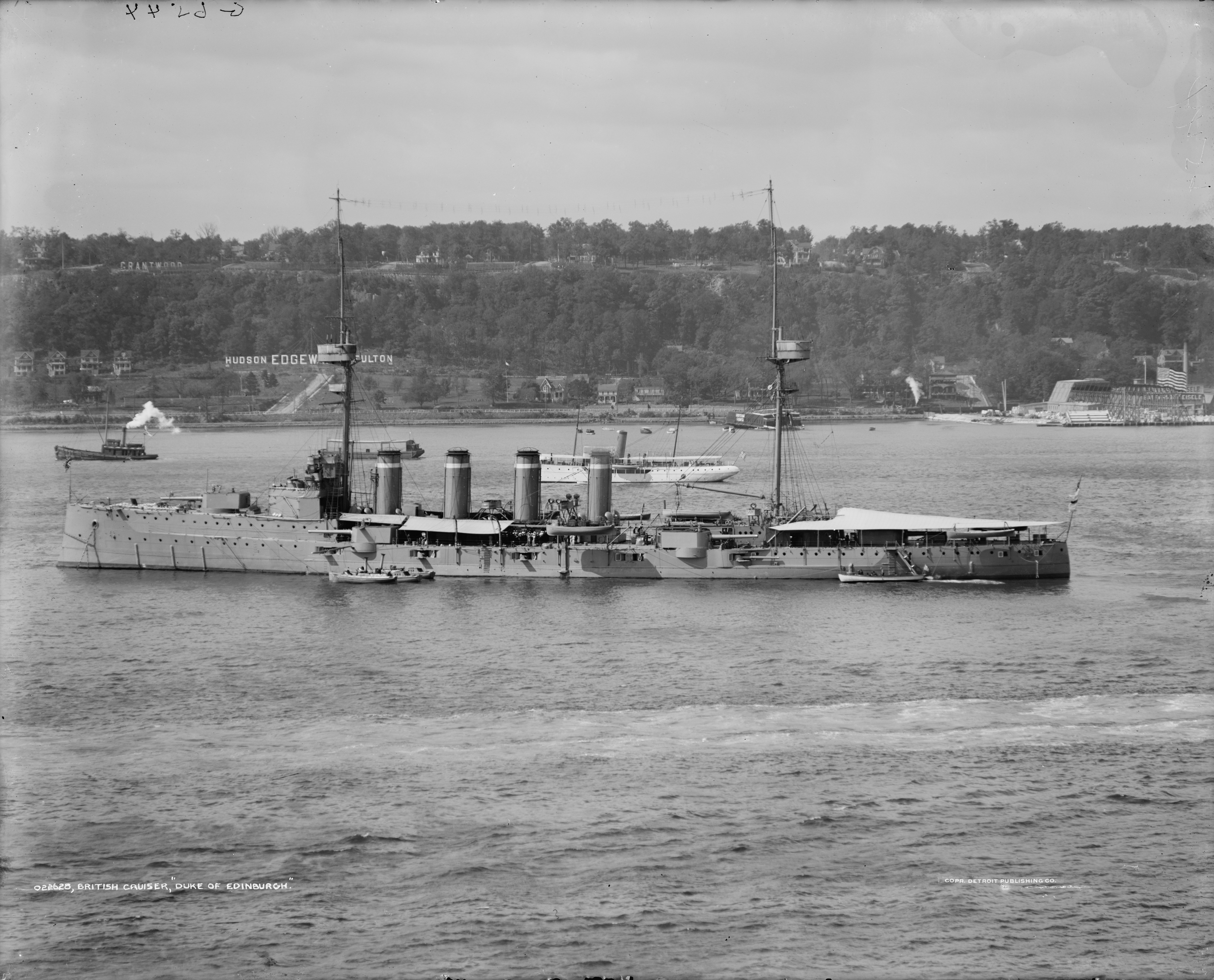
Duke of Edinburgh

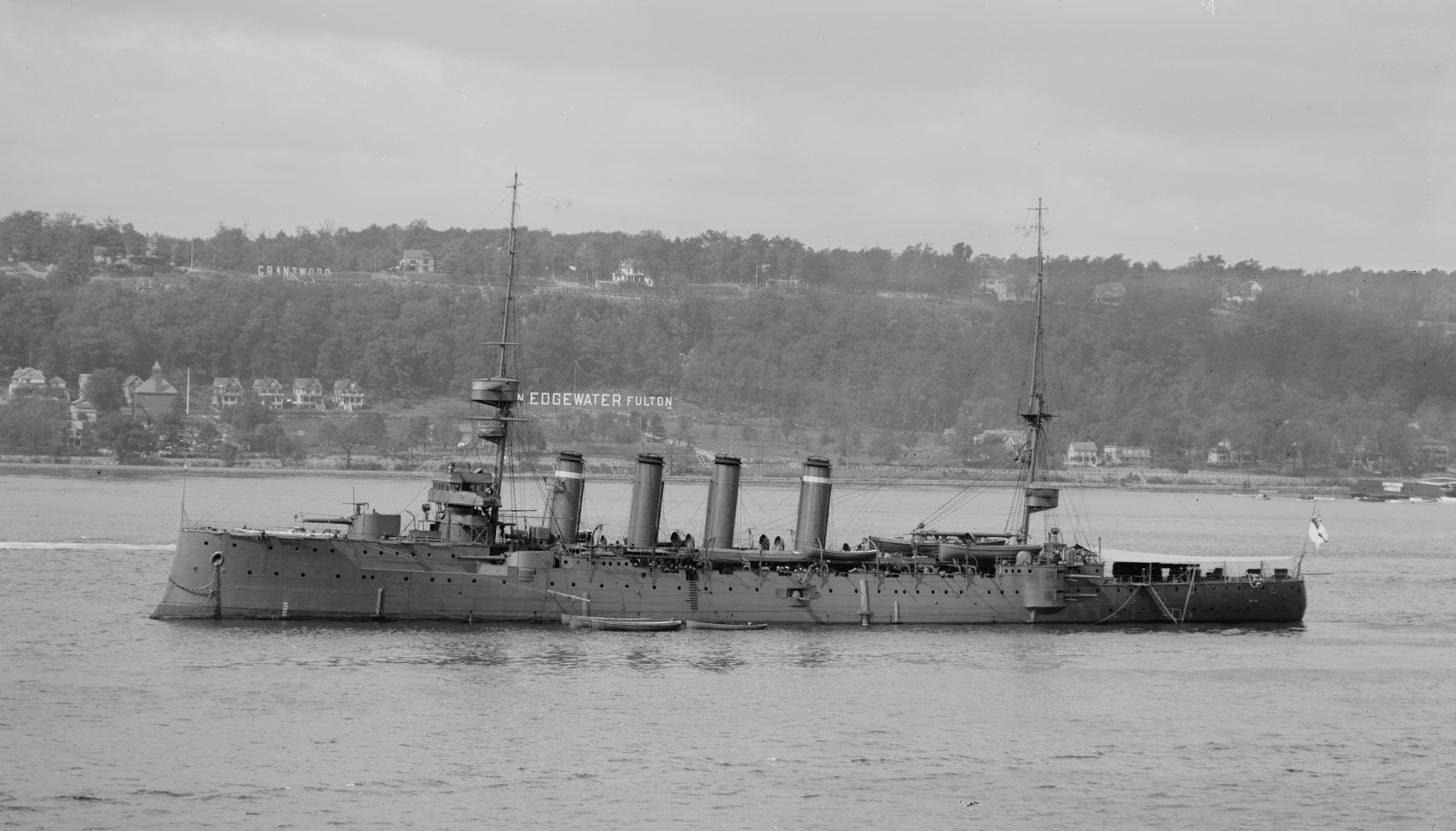
Argyll

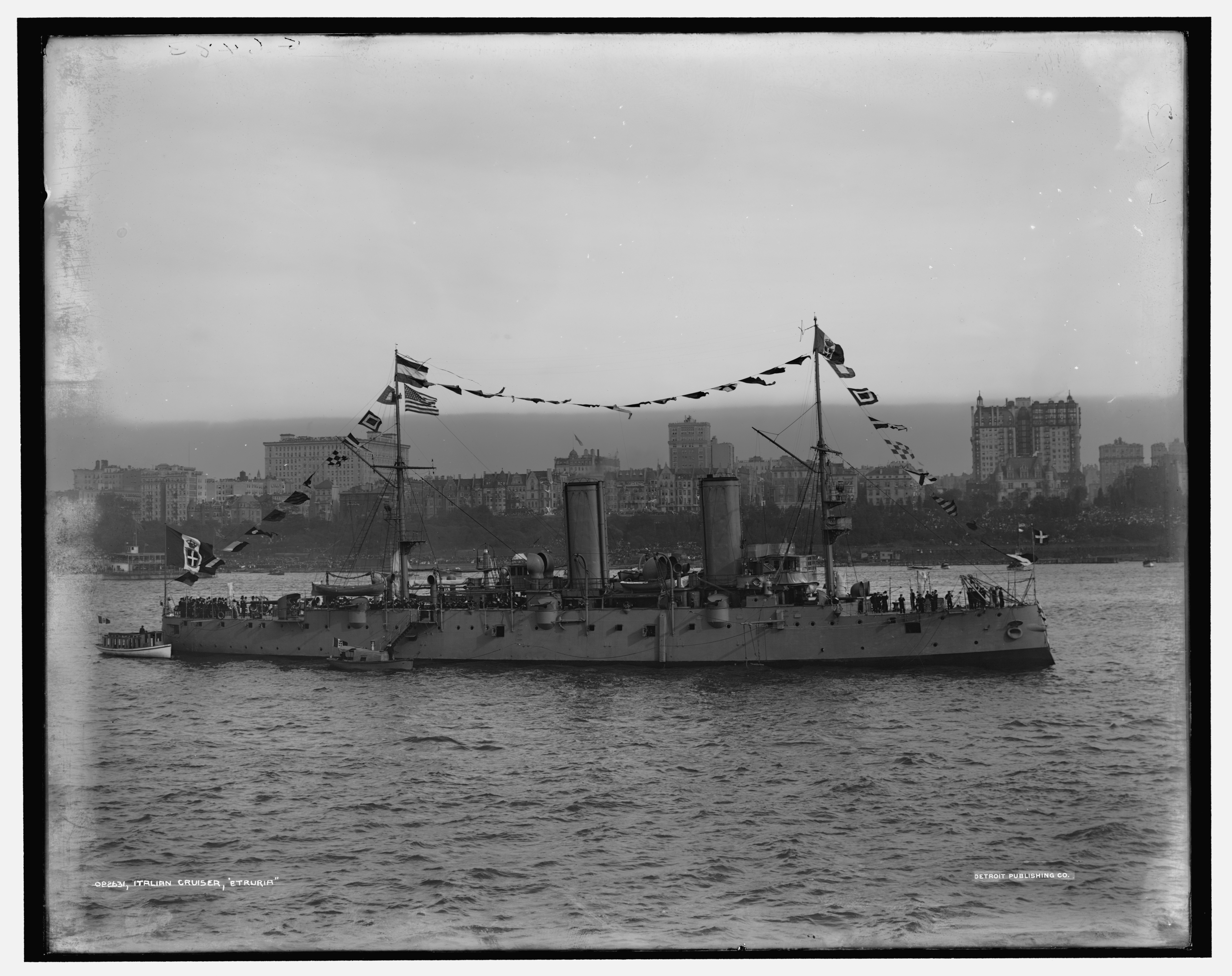
Etruria

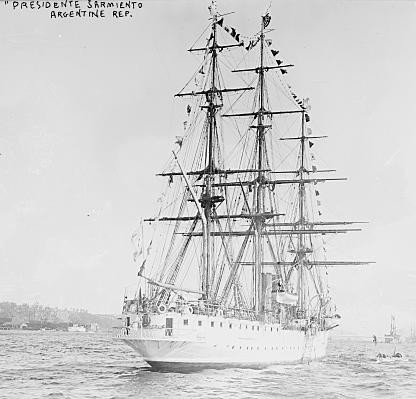
Presidente Sarmiento

== See also ==
- NY400 in 2009
