= Visserseiland =

Coordinates: 52°38′5″N 5°3′45″E

Location of Visserseiland in Hoorn

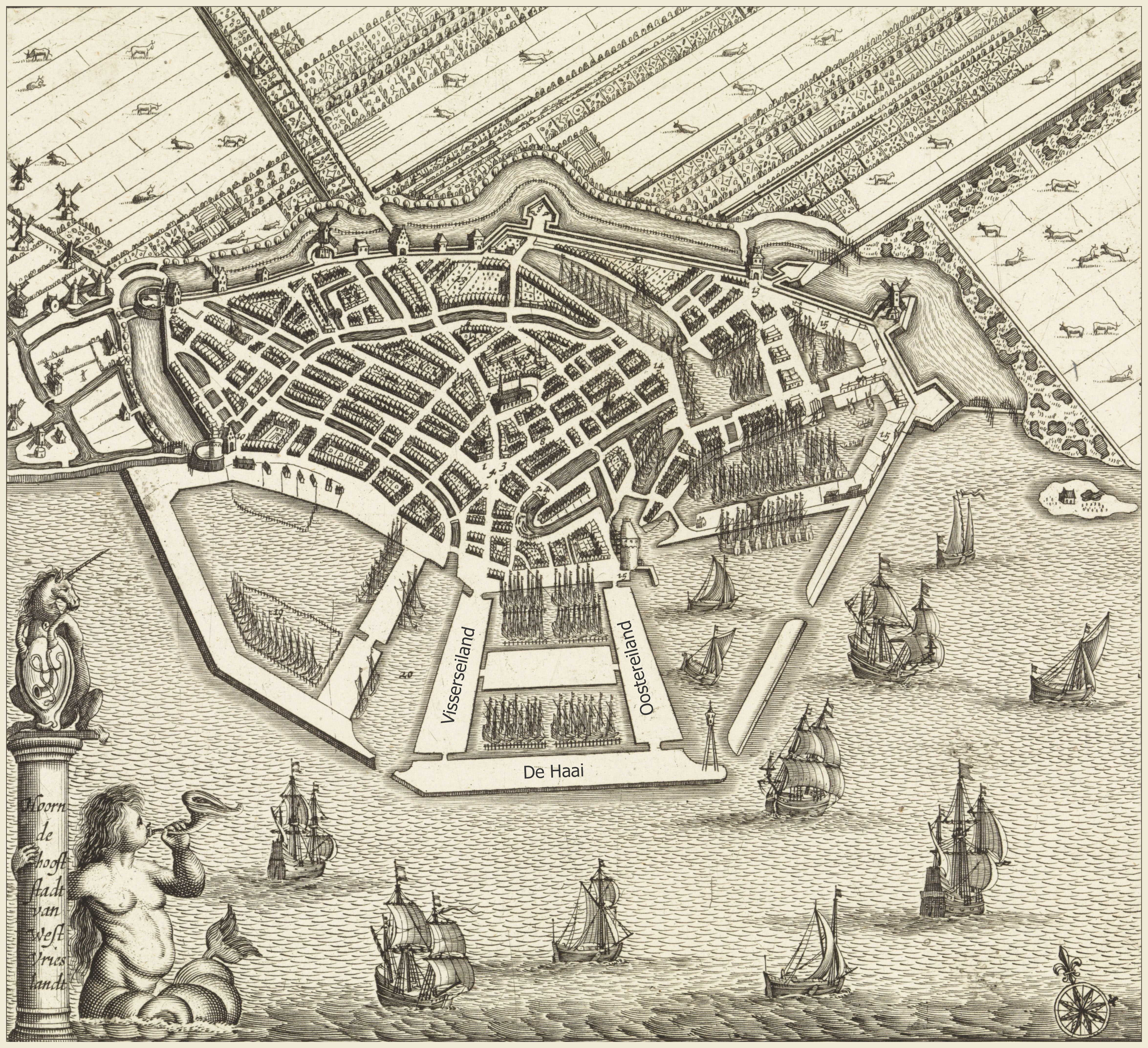
Map of Hoorn in 1648 showing the planned port extensions

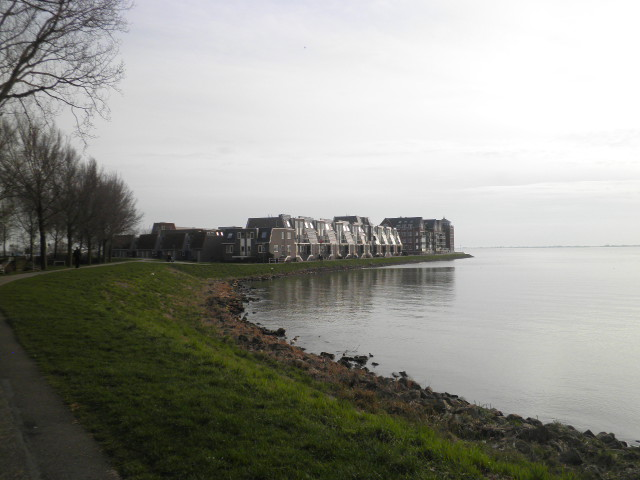
Visserseiland, view from the south

The Visserseiland ("Fisherman's island") is a man-made peninsula in the harbor of the Dutch city Hoorn. It was constructed in the 17th century; formerly called Westereiland ("western island"), with the Oostereiland ("eastern island") across from the harbor, it created extra docking capacity and separated the Grashaven from the Zuiderzee.

== History ==
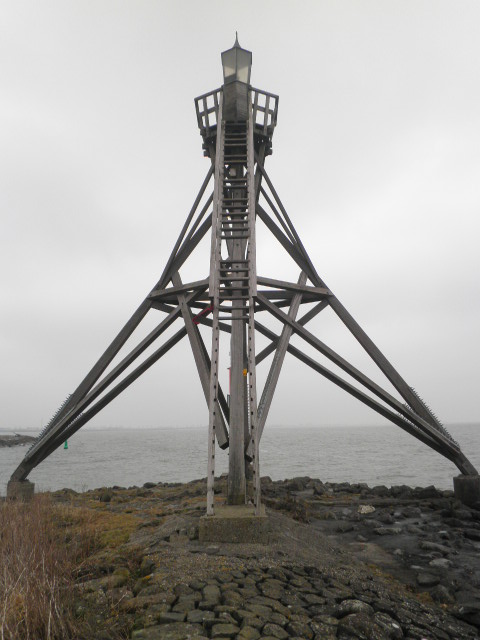
Harbor light, 2012

By the mid-17th century, toward the end of the Dutch Golden Age, the port city of Hoorn required more space for ships to dock. The dike which later grew into the Visserseiland was constructed in 1662. At first called Westereiland, it became a settlement for fisherman who made their living on the Zuiderzee, and that gave it its current name. The first commercial business buildings are already depicted in a 1675 painting by Matthias Withoos. Two wind-powered sawmills were on the island at the end of the 19th century: "De Halm" and "De Rob". De Halm burned down in 1904, and De Rob was torn down in 1924. The island also had a tannery (which treated cotton fishing nets) and smokehouses; the tannery was moved to the Zuiderzee Museum in Enkhuizen in 1980.

On the island's south side was a bathhouse between 1882 and 1918, the predecessor of the later "Witte Badhuis", or "white bathhouse". Along the dike a number of sculptures were placed in the 20th century, and it ends with a lighthouse that indicates the entrance to the harbor. The original light was built in 1660, and torn down in 1968; a replica was placed there a few years after.

By 1995, plans for large-scale development of the island (including the construction of 152 homes and a 15-storey apartment building) had been developed. These were not executed.

== Sculptures ==
Along the path that leads to the lighthouse, the city installed a series of sculptures. In 2021, the newly placed statue "The bleeding Madonna" was removed after only two days, following threats of vandalism on social media. The sculpture was moved to a less public location, a courtyard on the Roode Steen. A different and "proper" sculpture replaced it.

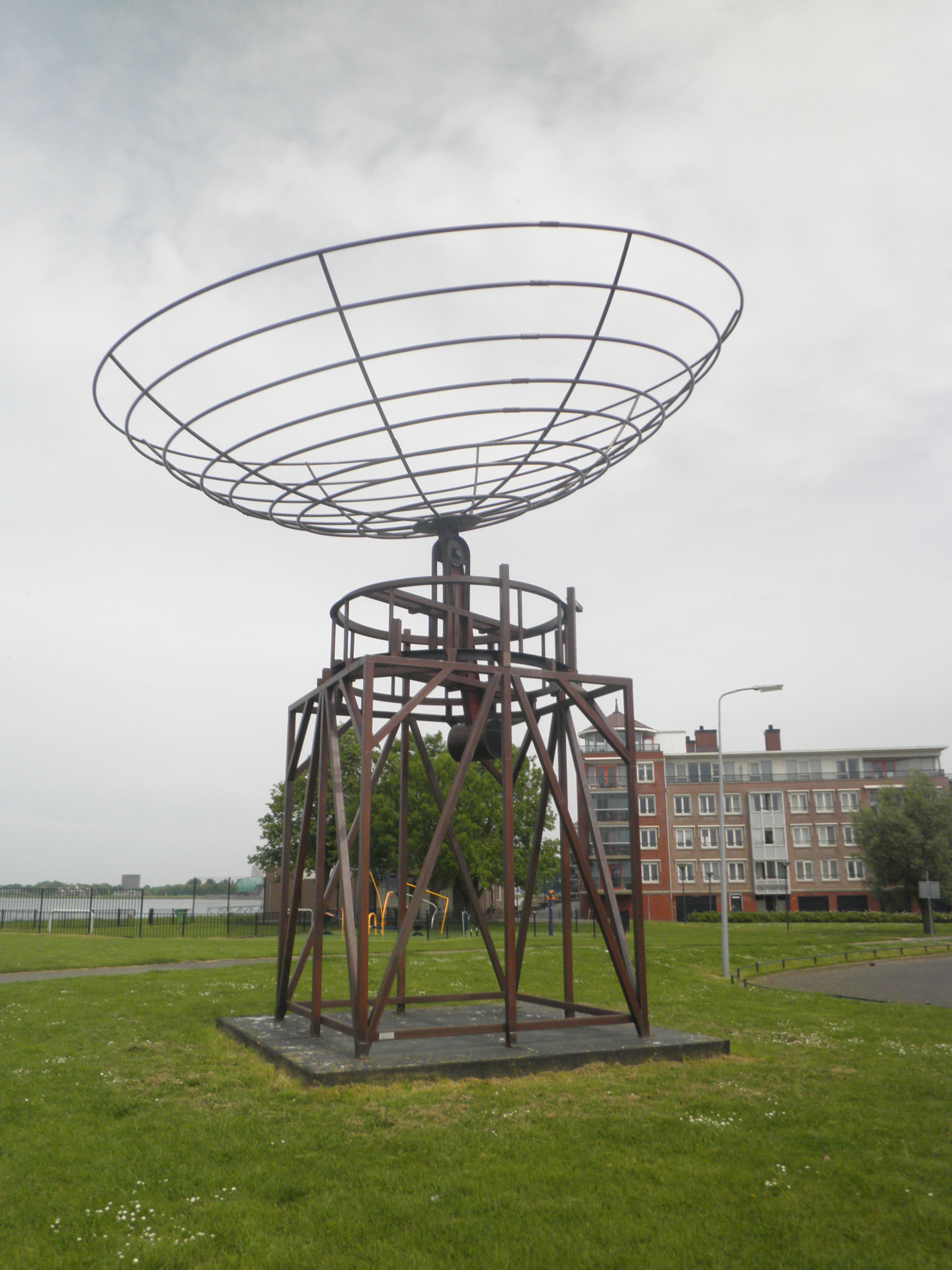
Innerspace

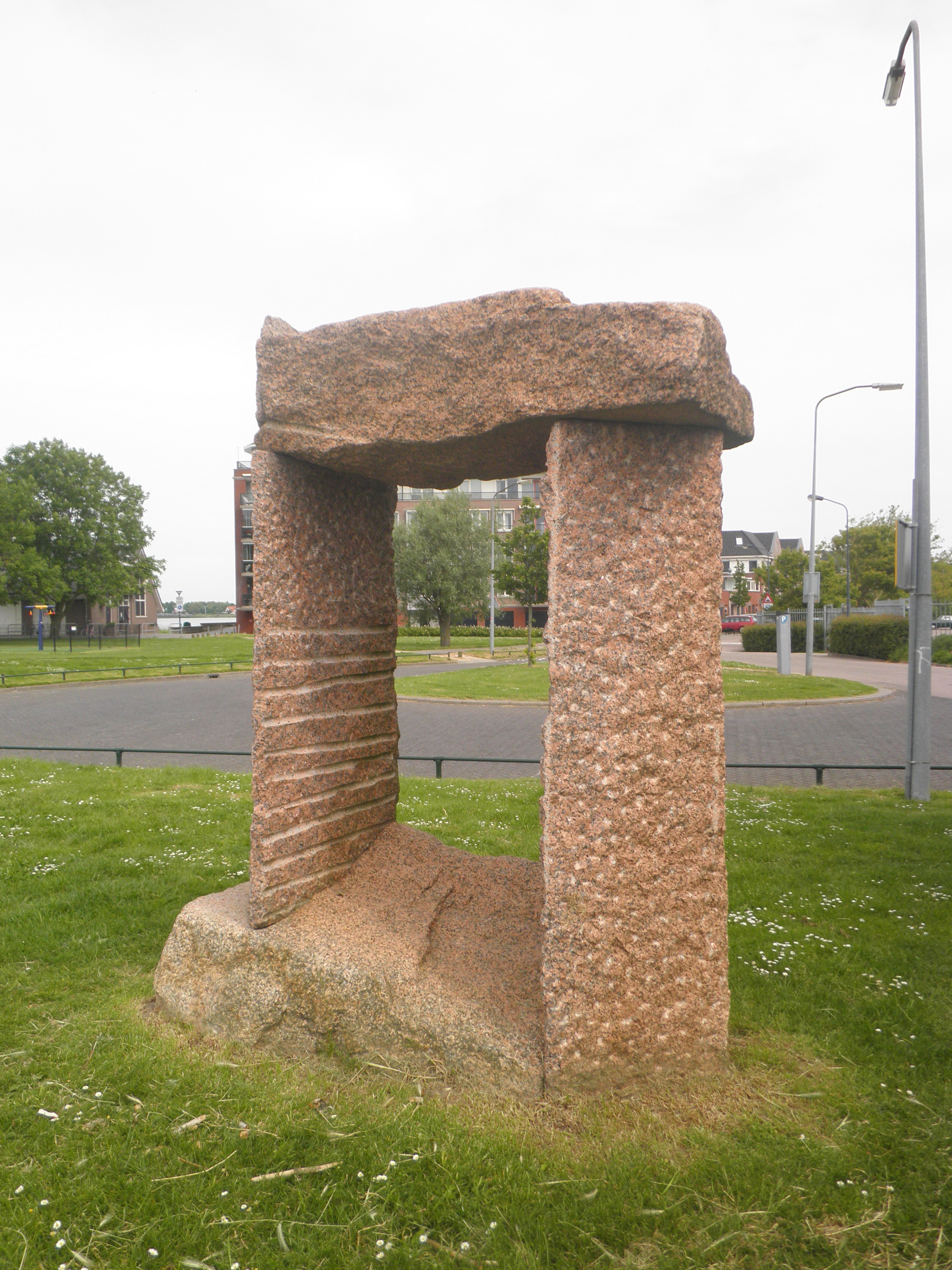
Venster ("window")

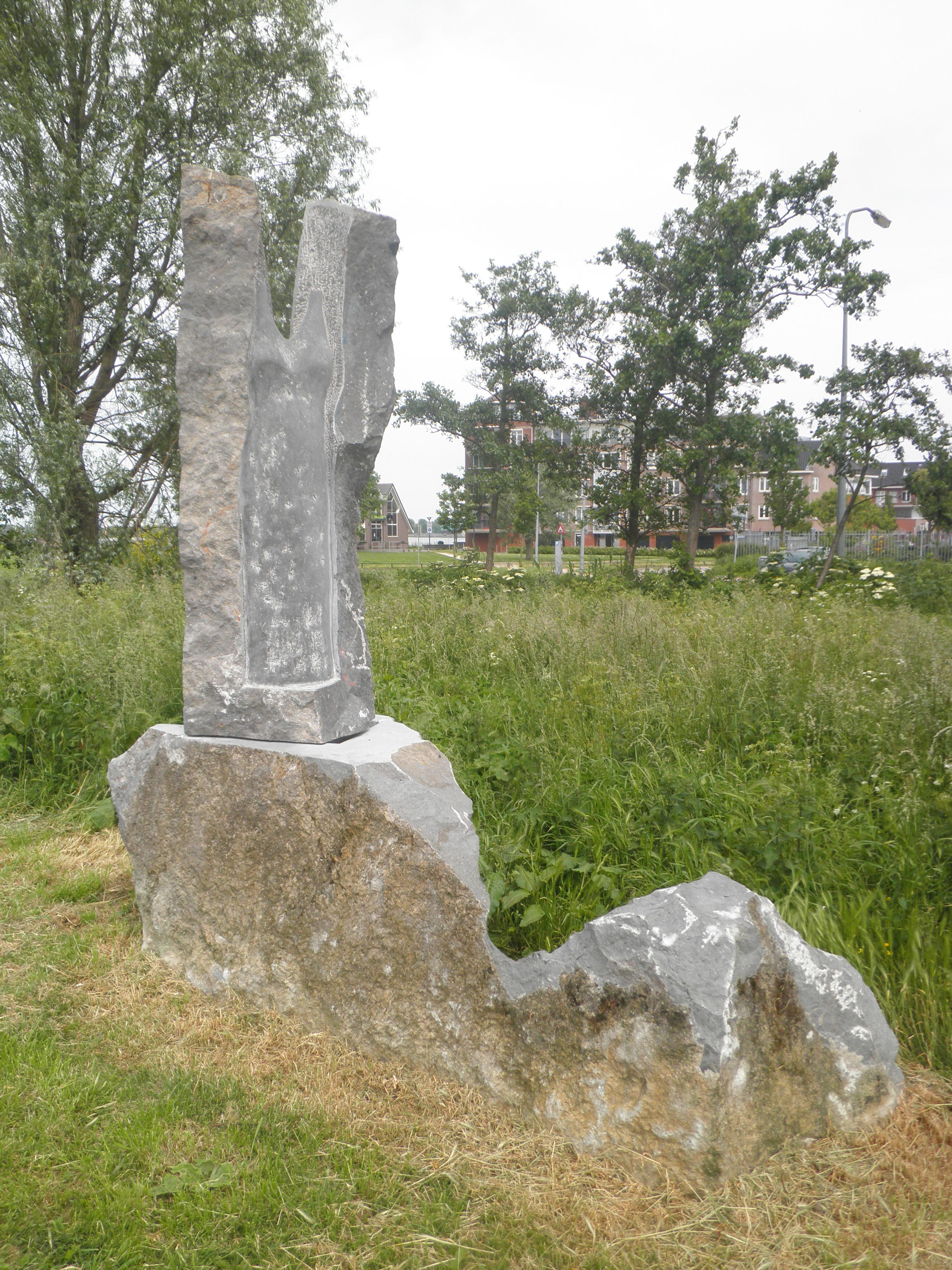
De Uitkijkjurk ("dress with a view")

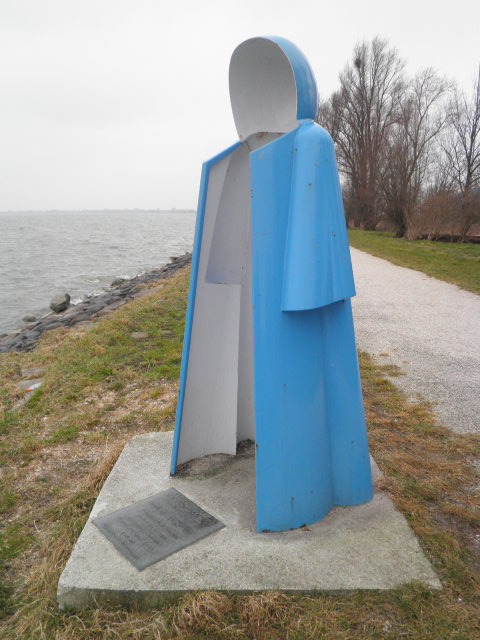
Cape

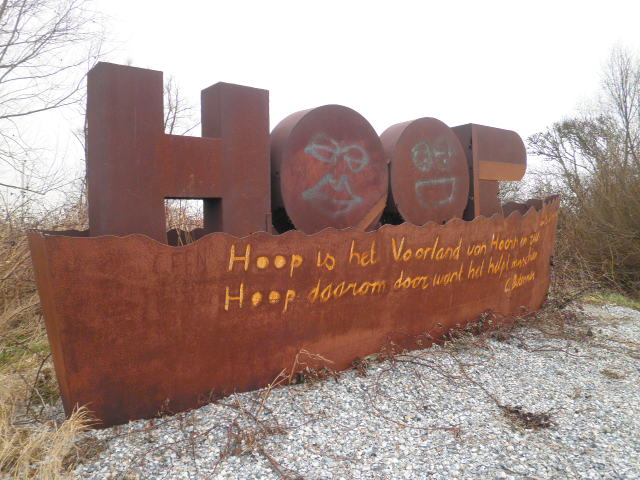
Hoop ("hope")

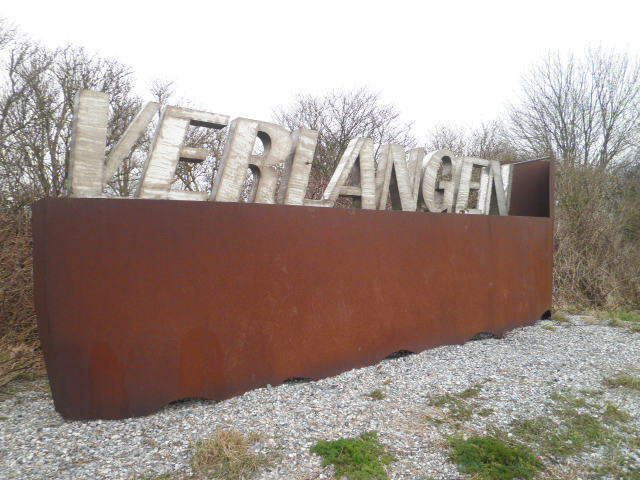
Verlangen ("desire")

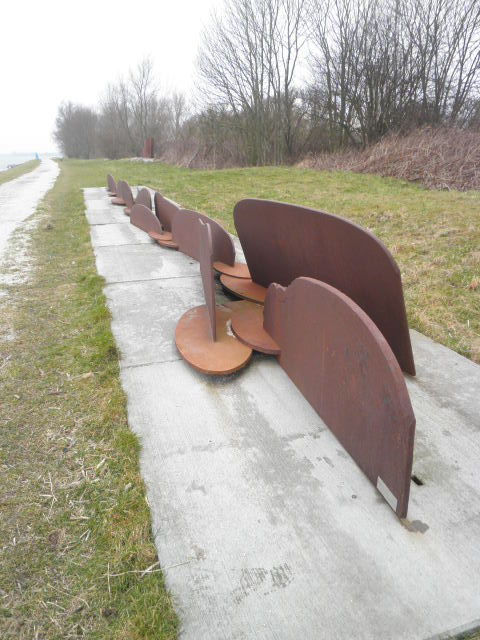
Land en Water ("land and water")

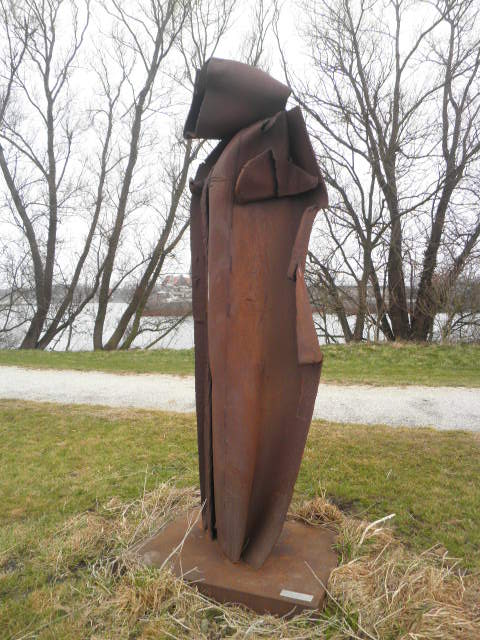
Dijtla
