= Goverthing =

Temporary art exhibit

Goverthing was a temporary art exhibit in 2009.

Goverthing was ostensibly a small town on Governors Island in New York Harbor in the United States, until 1954. Forcibly evacuated because the city of New York considered it a safety hazard, the town was buried in sand rather than being demolished. During excavations for a planned park on the island, the town was rediscovered. The park project was put on hold and a full archeological restoration of the town was in progress.

Geert Hautekiet, who was in charge of exhibiting the site, is known in his native Belgium for "guerilla theater and sly conceptual art". That and the coincidence between the town's discovery and the New Island Festival, a Dutch art festival on the island that ran from September 10–20, 2009, lead many to believe that it was an elaborate yet entertaining hoax.

New York City artist George Spencer created a similar exhibit which combined sculpture and performance art with a faux archeological theme in 2002.
