= Halve Maen =

Dutch ship Henry Hudson sailed in 1609 to modern New York Harbor

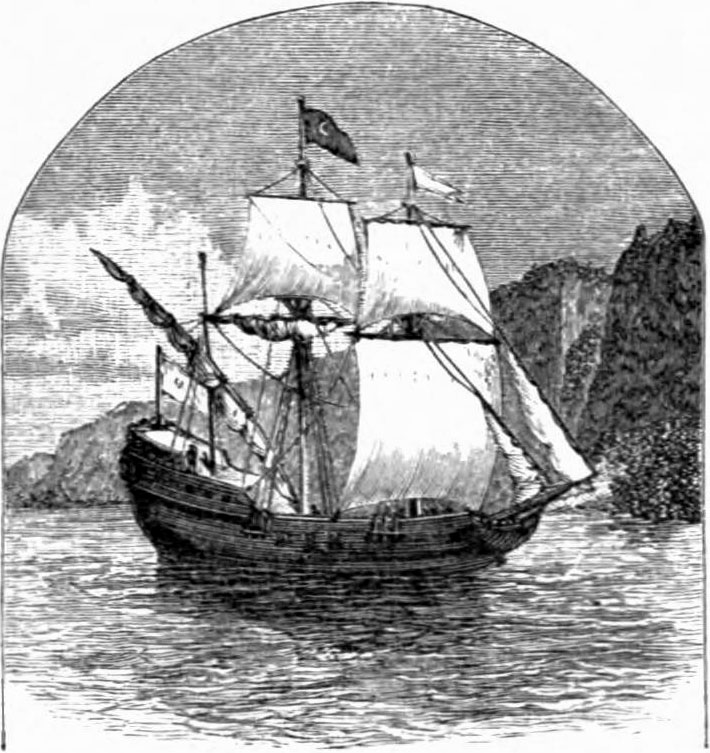
- 19th-century illustration of Halve Maen

History

Dutch Republic
- Name: Halve Maen
- Owner: Dutch East India Company; Chamber of Amsterdam
- Completed: 1608
- Fate: Destroyed

Halve Maen (Dutch pronunciation: [ˌɦɑlvə ˈmaːn]; transl. "Half Moon") was a Dutch East India Company jacht (similar to a carrack) that sailed into what is now New York Harbor in September 1609. She had a length of 21 metres and was commissioned by the VOC Chamber of Amsterdam in the Dutch Republic to covertly find a northern passage to Asia. The ship was captained by Henry Hudson, an Englishman in the service of the Dutch Republic.

In 1909, the Kingdom of the Netherlands presented the United States with a replica of Halve Maen to commemorate the 300th anniversary of Hudson's voyage; the replica was destroyed in a fire in 1934. Over 50 years later, in 1989, the New Netherland Museum commissioned a second replica, which sailed for several decades along the Hudson River until it was transported in 2015 to the Westfries Museum in Hoorn, Netherlands, where it is permanently moored.

== History ==
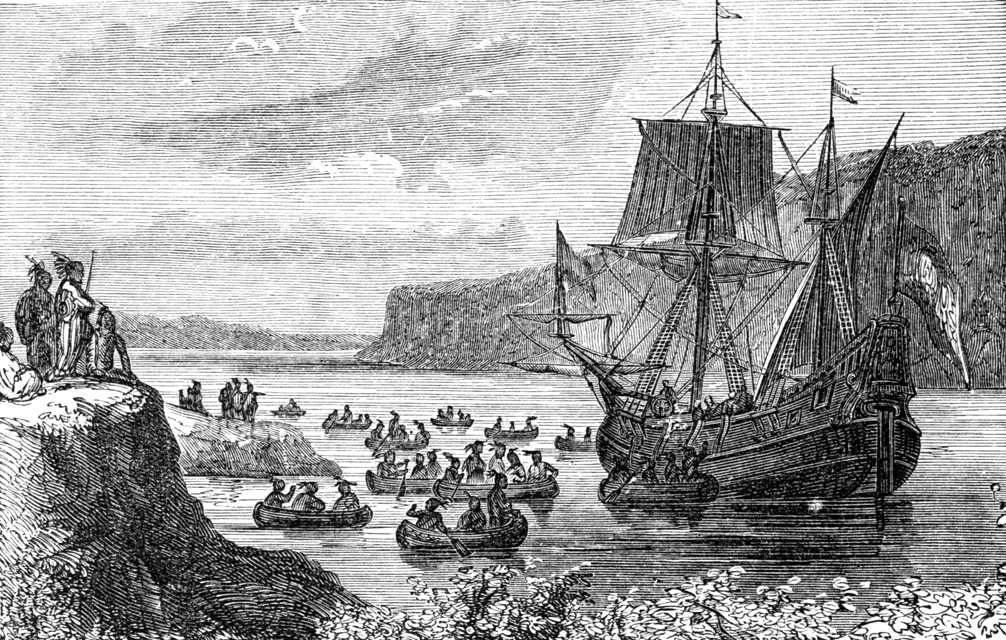
19th-century illustration Halve Maen in the Hudson River in 1609

Halve Maen was built on a wharf on Rapenburg.

On behalf of the Dutch East India Company, she set sail from the Netherlands on April 6, 1609 under the command of the Englishman Henry Hudson to explore the Northwest Passage to the Pacific. After a severe storm in ice and snow in the North Cape, the expedition finally reached the Newfoundland Bank and what is now Canada. From Cape Sable, Hudson followed the eastern American coast south to the Delaware River, past Manhattan and Long Island. In the summer of 1609, Hudson sailed the Hudson River named after him to what is now Albany. Since Hudson could not find a passage to the Pacific this way, he returned to the Netherlands.

In his 1625 book New World, which contains invaluable extracts from Hudson's lost journal, Johannes de Laet, a director of the West India Company, writes that they "bent their course to the south until, running south-southwest and southwest by south, they again made land in latitude 41° 43’, which they supposed to be an island, and gave it the name of New Holland, but afterwards discovered that it was Cape Cod".

From there they sailed south to the Chesapeake Bay and then went north along the coast navigating first the Delaware Bay and, subsequently, the bay of the river which Hudson named the Mauritius River, for Holland's Lord-Lieutenant Maurits. Halve Maen sailed up Hudson's river as far as Kinderhook, and the ship's boat with five crew members ventured to the vicinity of present-day Albany, New York, where the crew determined the water was too narrow and too shallow for further progress. Concluding then that the river was also not a passage to the west, Hudson exited the river, naming the natives that dwelled on either side of the Mauritius estuary the Manahata. Leaving the estuary, he sailed north-eastward, never realizing that what are now the islands of Manhattan and Long Island were islands, and crossed the Atlantic to England where he sailed into Dartmouth harbor with the Dutch East India Company ship and crew.

In 1618, or a few years after, the ship was destroyed during an English attack on Jakarta in the Dutch East Indies.

== Replicas ==
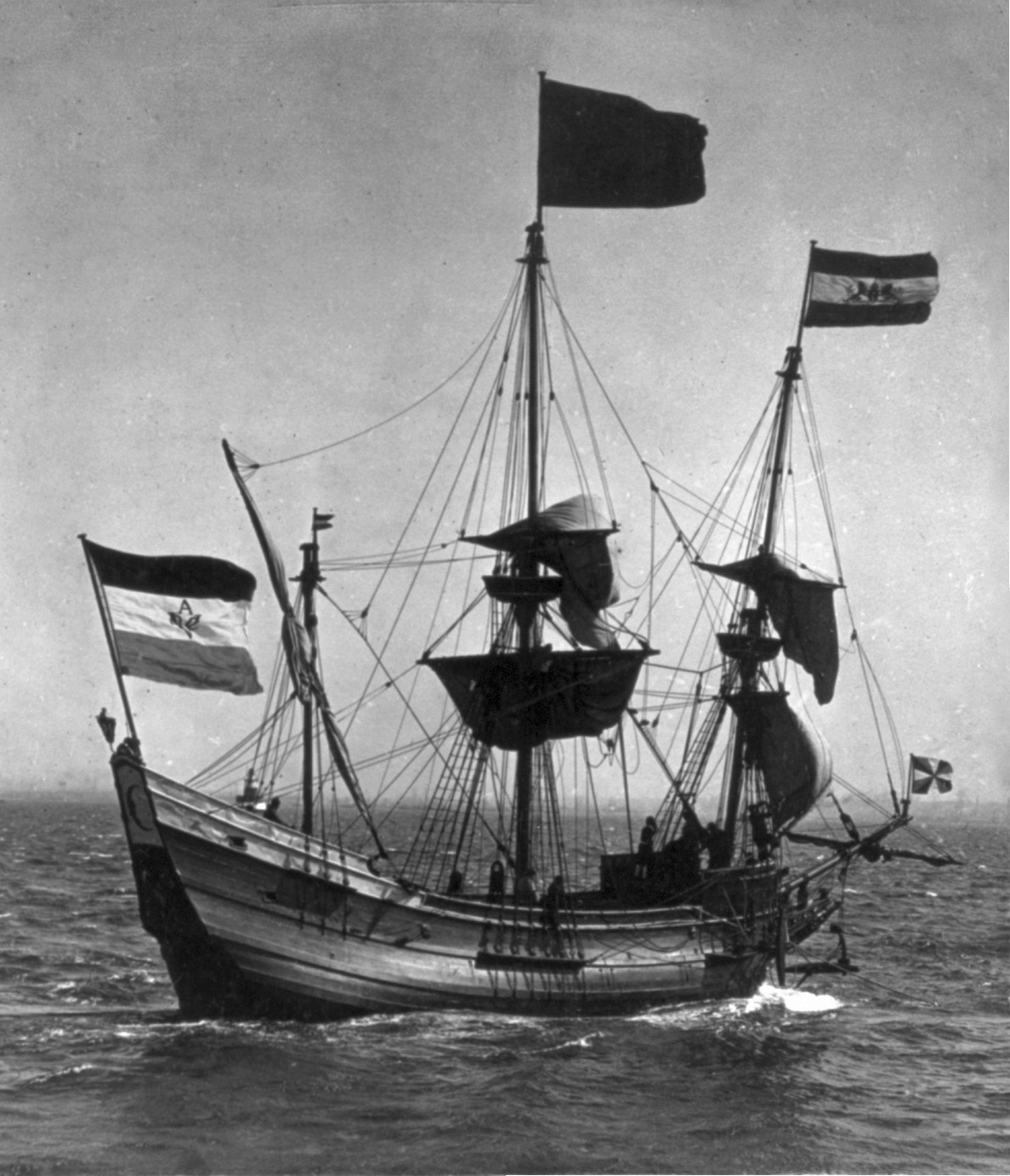
1909 replica of Halve Maen

=== 1909 replica ===
In 1909 a replica of Halve Maen was given to the United States by the Kingdom of the Netherlands on the occasion of the 300th anniversary of Hudson's voyage. The ship was constructed at the Rijksmarinewerf in Amsterdam. The keel was laid on 29 October 1908, and on 15 April 1909 the ship was launched and then transported to the US on the Holland America Lines freight liner Soestdijk in order to attend the 1909 Hudson-Fulton Celebration in New York, arriving in July. She appeared in a parade with the American replica ship Clermont celebrating Robert Fulton. This replica was eventually towed to Cohoes, New York, and perished in a fire in 1934; the Clermont was broken up for scrap 3 years later.

=== 1989 replica ===
Another replica of Halve Maen (officially Anglicized as Half Moon) was constructed in Albany, New York, in 1989 by Andrew Hendrickson, founder of the New Netherland Museum. The museum contracted with Nicholas S. Benton to design and build the replica. Benton, a master ship-rigger and shipwright, was president of the Rigging Gang of Middletown, Rhode Island, which specialized in colonial ship restoration and design. To prepare for building Half Moon, a $1 million project, Hendrickson and Benton visited maritime museums in the Netherlands and the United States. After Benton’s death while assisting with the rigging of another vessel, the construction of the Half Moon was completed following delays and additional expenses.

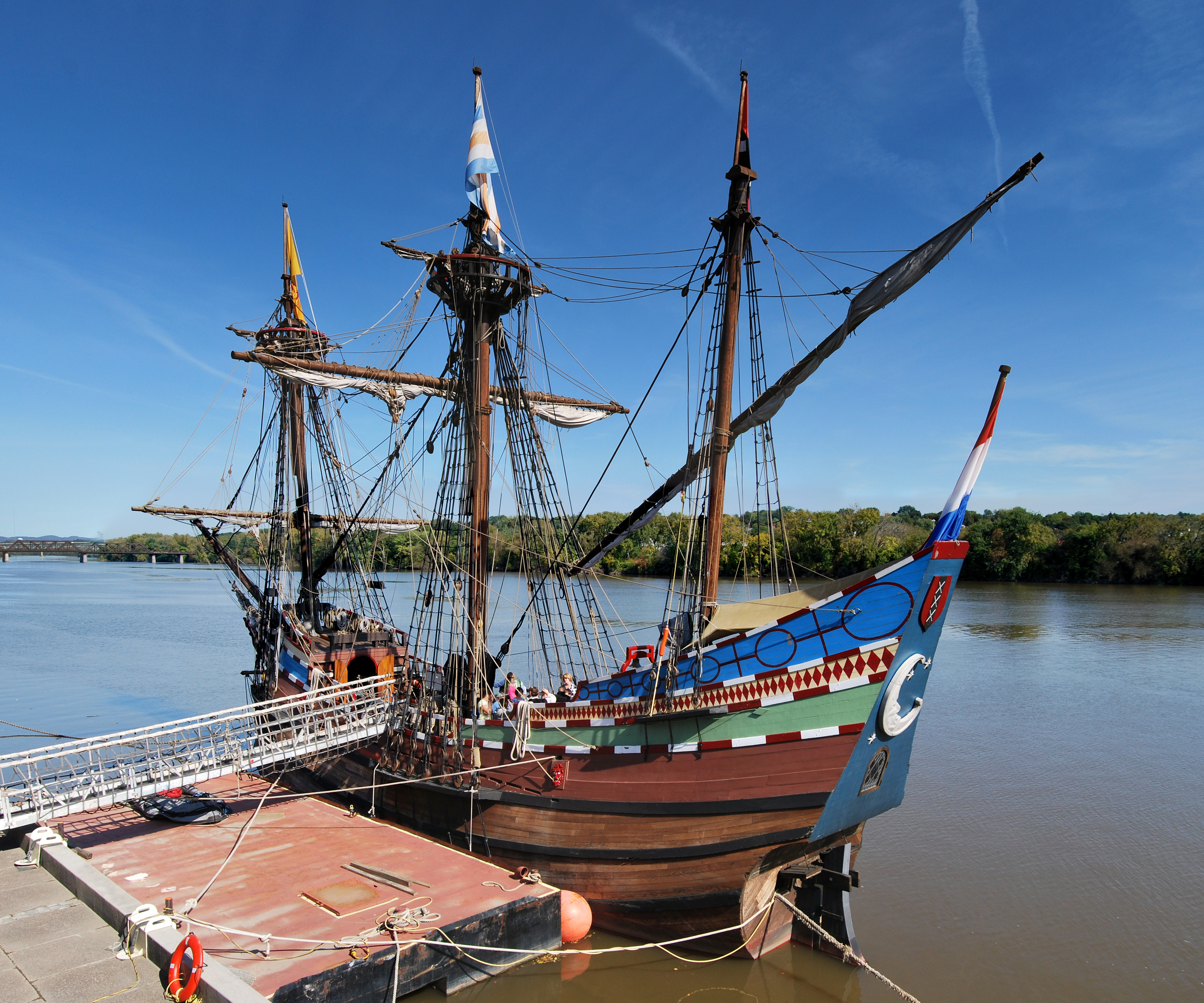
1989 replica of Halve Maen moored in the Hudson River at Albany, New York

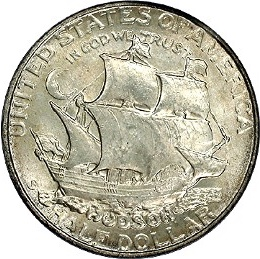
The Halve Maen on the obverse of the United States 1935 commemorative Hudson Sesquicentennial half dollar

The year 2009 marked NY400, the 400th anniversary of Halve Maen's voyage. For the anniversary, the crown prince of the Netherlands and his wife were on board, as well as students from a Dutch school. This anniversary was marked in September 2009 with festivals, music, and sailing ships parading around New York Harbor.

The New Netherland Museum, a non-for-profit organization, was assisted in the operation of the Half Moon by a crew of volunteers that ranged in age from their teens to octogenarians.

In April 2015, the ship was transported on loan to the Westfries Museum in Hoorn, Netherlands. The replica took part in SAIL Amsterdam 2015. In 2019, the Hoorn Council decided not to renew their lease. The Halve Maen was re-located to the port of Enkhuizen and made open to the public.

=== Weathervane ===
At 10 feet (3.0 m) in both height and length, the model of Halve Maen on top of the SUNY System Administration Building in Albany, New York, is claimed to be the largest working weathervane in North America.

== In popular culture ==
Halve Maen is mentioned in the 1819 story of Rip Van Winkle by Washington Irving, when the protagonist ventures into the Catskill Mountains and discovers Henry Hudson and the ship's crew.

== See also ==
- Henry Hudson Park
- History of Albany, New York
