= Half Moon (1989 replica) =

Replica of Henry Hudson's ship

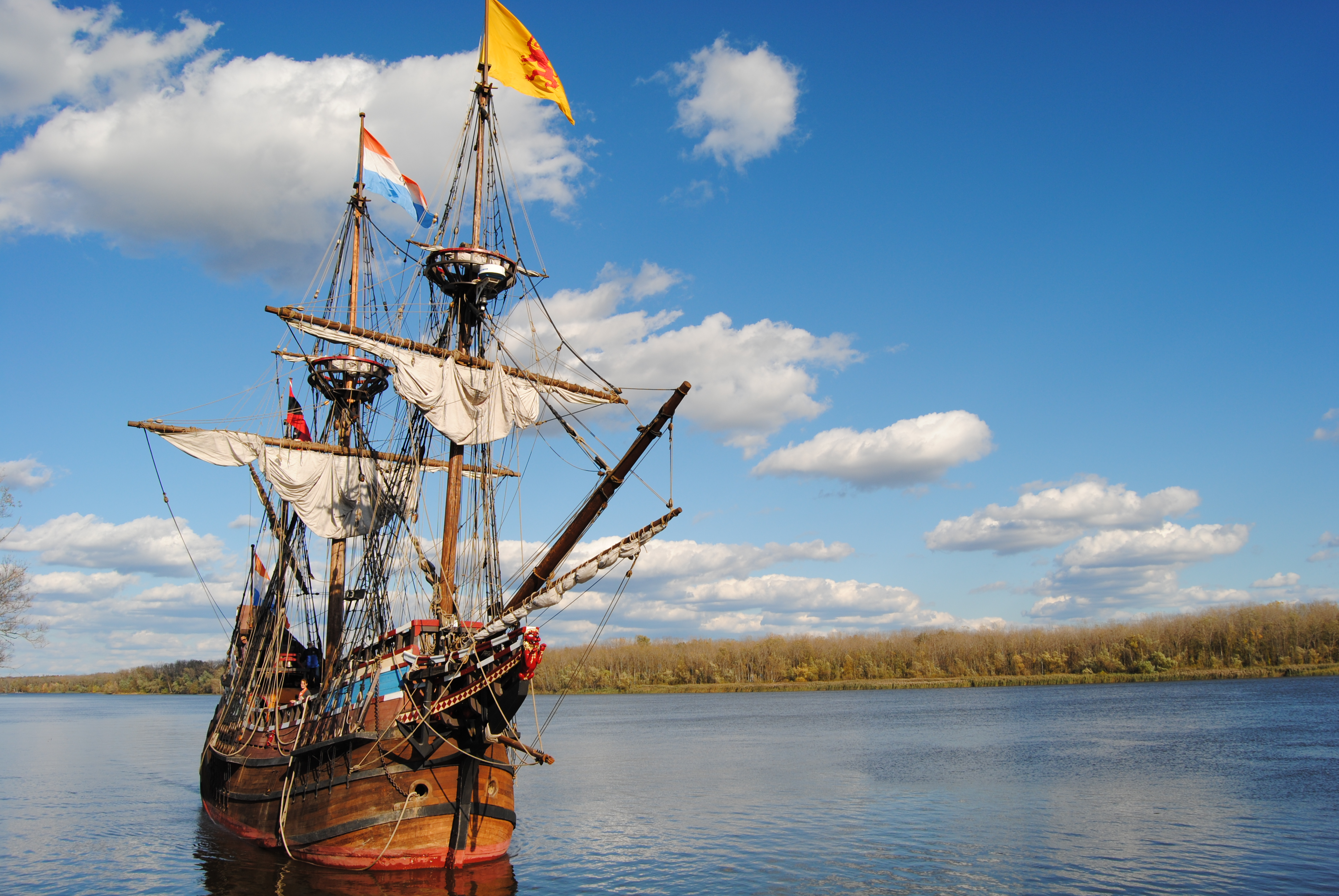
- Half Moon under sail on the Hudson River in New York State October 20, 2013

History

Netherlands
- Owner: New Netherland Museum
- Builder: Nicholas S. Benton, Albany, New York
- Cost: $1 million
- Launched: June 10, 1989
- Completed: 1989
- Home port: Kampen, Netherlands
- Identification: Call sign: WDE8672; MMSI number: 366464000

General characteristics
- Tonnage: 112 GRT
- Displacement: Near 150 tons
- Length: 85 ft (25.9 m)
- Beam: 18 ft (5.5 m)
- Height: 78 ft (23.8 m)
- Draft: 34 ft 7 in (10.5 m)
- Depth: 9 ft (2.7 m)
- Decks: 6
- Sail plan: square rigged ship, sail area 2,757 ft^{2} (256 m^{2})
- Crew: 15-20
- Armament: 2 starboard cannons, 2 port, 2 chasers

Half Moon is a replica of Halve Maen, the famed ship that English mariner Henry Hudson sailed up the Hudson River in 1609. The ship was constructed between 1988 and 1989 at the Snow Dock in Albany, New York, its construction commissioned by Dr. Andrew Hendricks. The ship's construction fulfilled Dr. Hendricks' dream to use the historic icon as an educational instrument, bridging the gap between the American way of life and the Dutch heritage in New York state. In March 2015, the replica ship departed the Hudson River Valley to a new home, Hoorn, The Netherlands. In February 2019, it was announced that the Hoorn government would not extend their contract to serve as the Dutch homeport of the Half Moon. Hoorn's contract expired on April 1, 2020. The Half Moon is currently at port in Kampen, Netherlands. The board of directors of the New Netherland Museum have not announced what the future of the ship may hold.

== History ==
=== Construction ===
In 1988, Dr. Andrew Hendricks commissioned the construction of a full-scale replica of Halve Maen, the famed ship sailed by English mariner, Henry Hudson in 1609. Master ship-rigger and shipwright, Nicholas S. Benton, President of the Rigging Gang of Middleton was hired to design and build the replica. It took an entire year to build the Half Moon. To prepare for the build, Benton visited maritime museums in the Netherlands and the United States. On June 19, 1989, Benton was working on a mast of a schooner in the City of Rensselaer when the mast snapped and he fell to his death. Benton was only 35 years old. Many of the plans for the Half Moon's construction were never documented, and without Benton, the New Netherland Museum had to continue the process on their own, ironing out the kinks along the way.

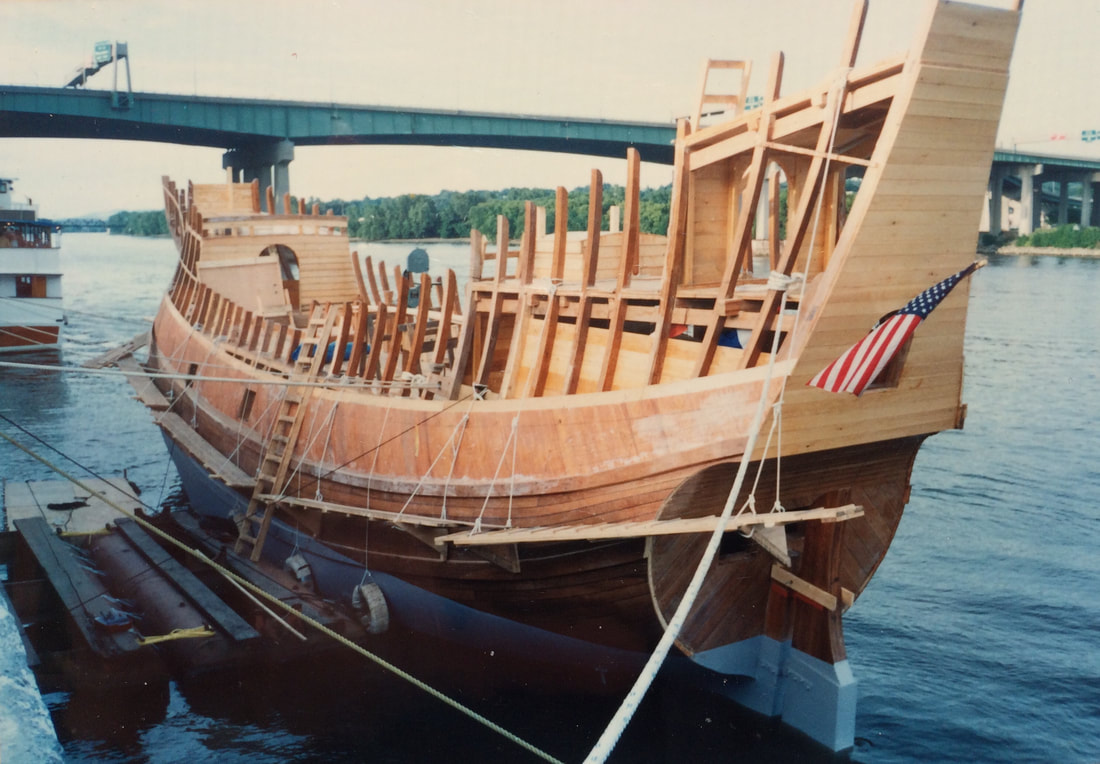
The Half Moon is launched on the Hudson River, June 10, 1989. Photo by Muddy Paddle

=== Voyage of Discovery ===
The Voyage of Discovery program launched in 1999, with the first recreation of Henry Hudson's voyage up the river that would later bear his name. The program provided the opportunity for area middle school students to experience life as 17th century sailors. Each fall, a dozen middle school students were selected to participate in the week-long program.

== Netherlands ==
On April 23, 2015, the Half Moon arrived in the Netherlands after being transported by BigLift's Traveller from New York to North Holland. The transport of the Half Moon began on April 7, 2015. In March 2015, the Board of Directors of the New Netherland Museum announced that the replica would be leaving New York waters, citing financial hardships. It was later announced that the ship would be on loan to the Westfries Museum in North Holland for at least 5 years. The government of Hoorn, Netherlands became the fiscal sponsor of the ship and the Westfries Museum served as the organization responsible for the daily operations of the Half Moon. Over the span of 5 years, the museum provided tours to thousands of visitors and students, and major maintenance projects were also completed.

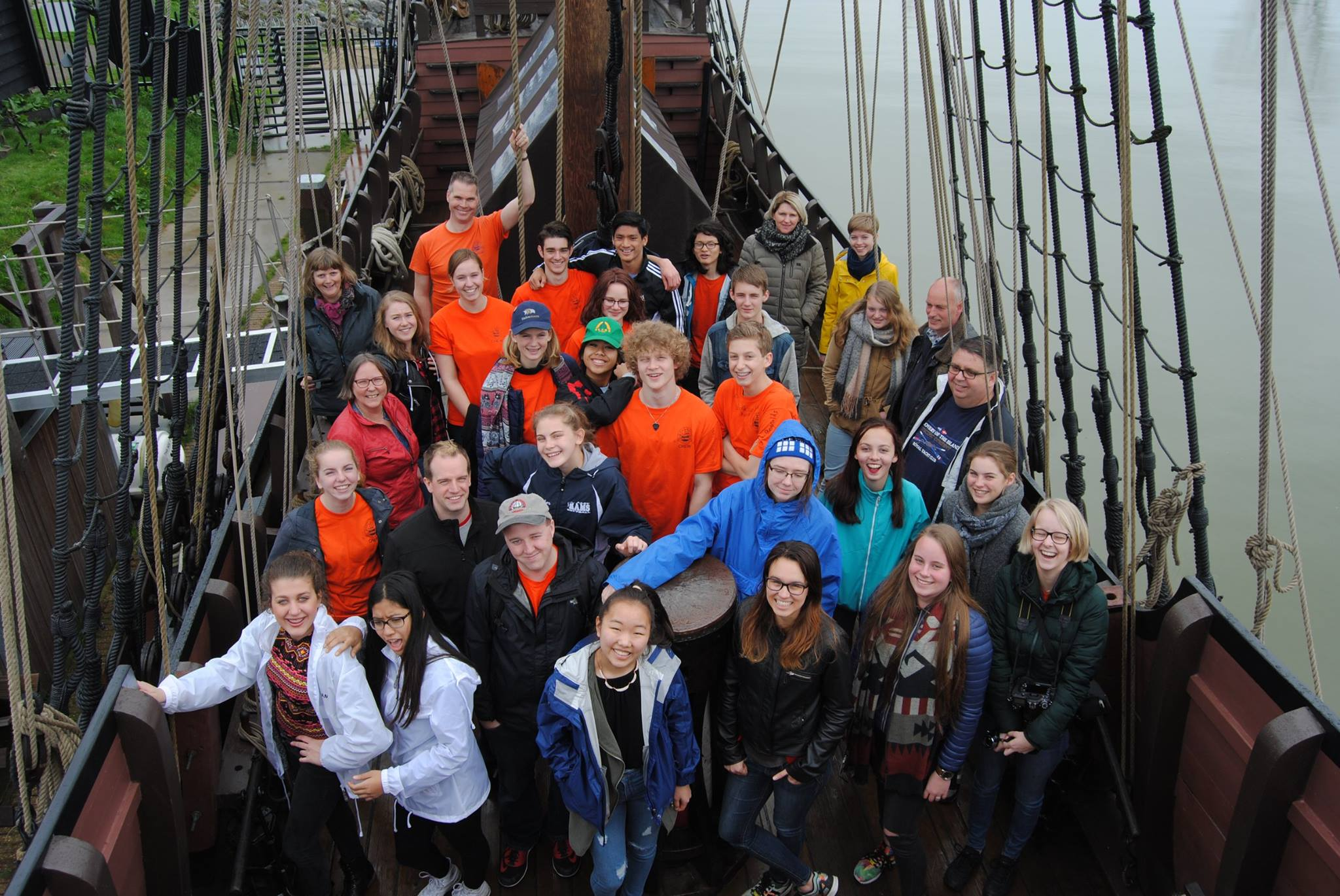
Rensselaer City School District and Bornego College students and teachers aboard Half Moon in Hoorn, Netherlands

== Movies and productions ==
The Half Moon appeared in the 1994 Disney film "Squanto: A Warrior's Tale," the 1995 version of "The Scarlet Letter" starring Demi Moore, and in 1998, the Italian pirate movies Carabi (English title: Pirates: Blood Brothers) and Pirate. She also played the role of the ship Susan Constant in the 2005 film The New World and in 2006 provided the backdrop for The First Landing.

In 2002, the Half Moon appeared in America's First River, Bill Moyers on the Hudson for PBS, and in 2005 in Conquest of America: the Northeast on History Channel. In 2015, prior to arriving in Hoorn, the ship participated in the filming of the HBO movie, The Devil You Know. The movie focuses on the Salem witch trials.

In various movies, the Half Moon was often transformed into an English ship, and her vivid paint colors were also muted.

== See also ==
- Halve Maen, information relating to the original Halve Maen as well as both the 1909 and 1989 replicas.
